= Tree shaping methods =

Tree shaping methods and techniques

There are various methods of tree shaping. There are strengths and weaknesses to each method as well commendable tree species for each process. Some of these processes are still experimental, whereas others are still in the research stage. These methods use a variety of horticultural and arboricultural techniques to achieve an intended design. Chairs, tables, living spaces and art may be shaped from growing trees. Some techniques used are unique to a particular practice, whereas other techniques are common to all, though the implementation may be for different reasons. These methods usually start with an idea of the intended outcome. Some practitioners start with detailed drawings or designs. Other artists start with what the tree already has. Each method has various levels of involvement from the tree shaper.

== Aeroponic culture ==
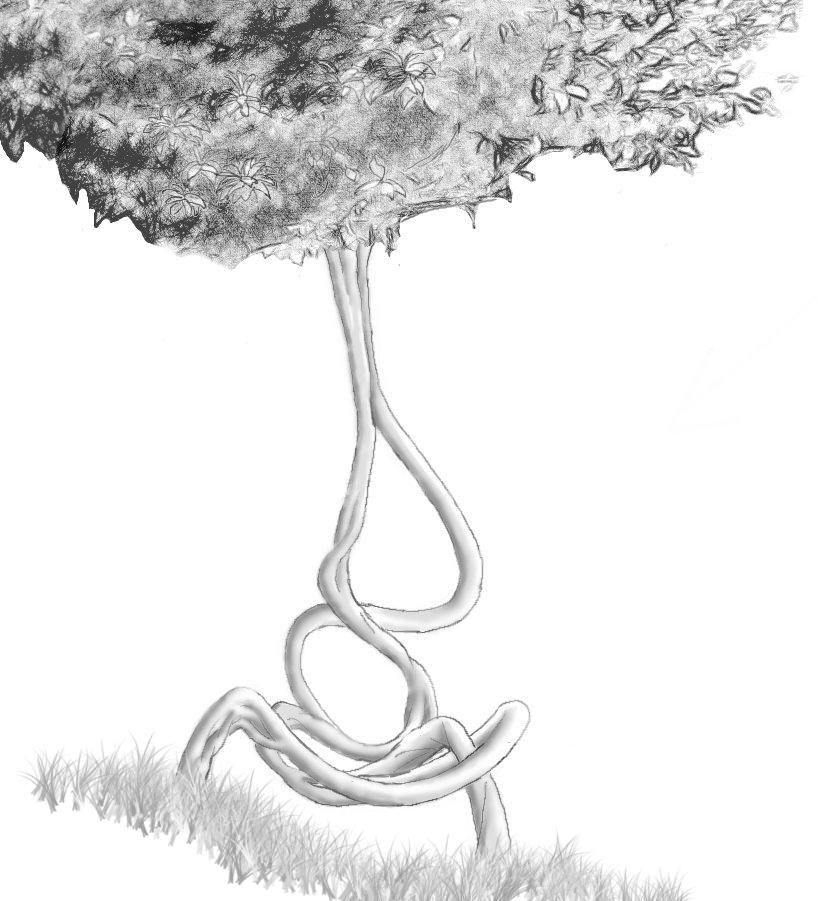
Chair created using aeroponic root shaping

With Aeroponic culture, the roots of the tree are the main thing shaped by this method. The oldest known living examples of woody plant shaping are the aeroponically cultured living root bridges built by the ancient War-Khasi people of the Cherrapunjee region in India. These are being maintained and further developed today by the people of that region. Aeroponic growing was first formally studied by W. Carter in 1942. Carter researched air culture growing and described "a method of growing plants in water vapor to facilitate examination of roots". Later researchers, including L. J Klotz and G. G. Trowel, expanded on his work. In 1957, F. W. Went described "the process of growing plants with air-suspended roots and applying a nutrient mist to the root section", and in it he coined the word 'aeroponics' to describe that process.

In 2008, root researcher and craftsman Ezekiel Golan described and applied for a patent for a process which allows the roots of some aeroponically grown woody plants to lengthen and thicken while still remaining flexible. At lengths of perhaps 6 metres (20 ft) or more, the soft roots can be formed into pre-determined shapes which will continue thickening after the shapes are formed and as they continue to grow.

Researchers at Plantware Co with Tel Aviv University Professors Yoav Waisel and Amram Eshel realised that "soft roots" when grown aeroponically, stay soft and malleable. Once the roots reach a suitable length to be molded and planted, the roots change and trigger lignification, hardening and thickening.

Newer techniques and applications, such as eco-architecture, may allow architects to design, grow, and form large permanent structures, such as homes, by shaping aeroponically grown plants and their roots.

== Instant tree shaping ==
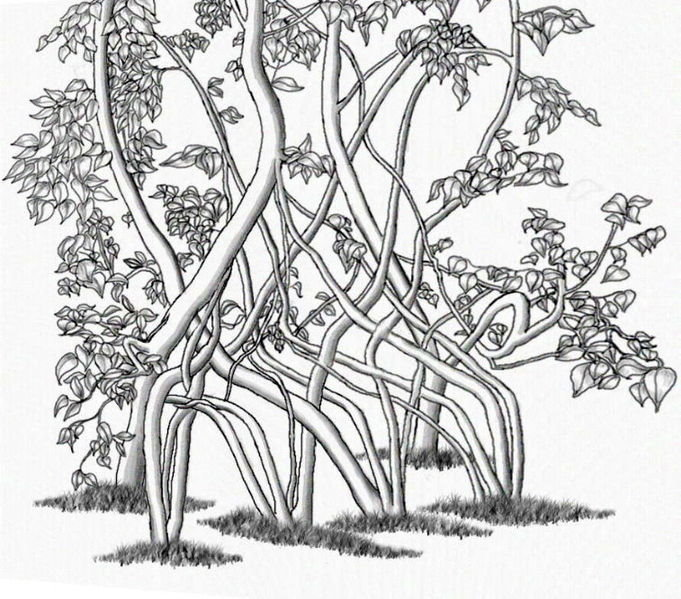
Arborsculpture bench by Richard Reames

Instant tree shaping is a widely used method. It uses mature trees, perhaps 6–12 ft. (2–3.5 m) long and 3-4in (7.6–10 cm) in trunk diameter. An instantaneous form is created by bending, weaving and sometimes cutting or marking the trees into the desired shape. Then the shaping is held in place till the tree has grown enough annual rings to hold the shape, effectively casting it permanently into place. Understanding a tree's fluid dynamics is important to achieving the desired result.

Bending is used to achieve a design. If the trees are bent at too sharp an angle it may break, which can be mostly avoided by un-localizing the pressure. This is achieved by making small bends or even cuts along the underside of the curve on the tree. The level of resistance depends on the speed of the tree's growth. Bends are then held in place for several years until their form is permanently cast. The tree's rate of growth determines the time necessary to overcome its resistance to the initial bending. The work of bending and securing in this way might be accomplished in an hour or perhaps in an afternoon depending on the design. Ring barking sometimes called girdling can be employed to help balance a design by slowing the growth of too-vigorous branches or stopping the growth of inopportunely placed branches, using different degrees of ring barking, from simple scoring to complete removal of a 3/8"-wide (1 cm) band of bark. This is a way to stop the tree from overgrowing a part or parts of the design, providing balance. Creasing is folding trees such as willow and poplar over upon themselves, creating a right angle. This method is more radical than bending.

With this method it is possible to perform initial bending and grafting on a project in an hour, as with Peace in Cherry by Richard Reames, removing supports in as little as a year and following up with minimal pruning thereafter. Though easy to do, the drawbacks to this method are many; for example, the tree's response to the efforts of the practitioner is difficult to forecast.

In 1977 David Nash created the Ash Dome with 22 ash saplings, forming a 30 ft ring in diameter. By cutting V-shaped notches into the trunk of the ash trees in the direction of the bending, the trees folded over into the bend. The dome is expected to have a 200-year lifespan. In 1998 Marcel Kalberer and Sanfte Strukuren and their team built The Auerworld Palace in less than 1 month. Weaving together living willows saplings to create the structural supports. Over time the entire palace is covered with the new growth of the willows. In private gardens, public spaces and in schools more than 10,000 living willow constructions have been erected in Germany.

== Gradual tree shaping ==
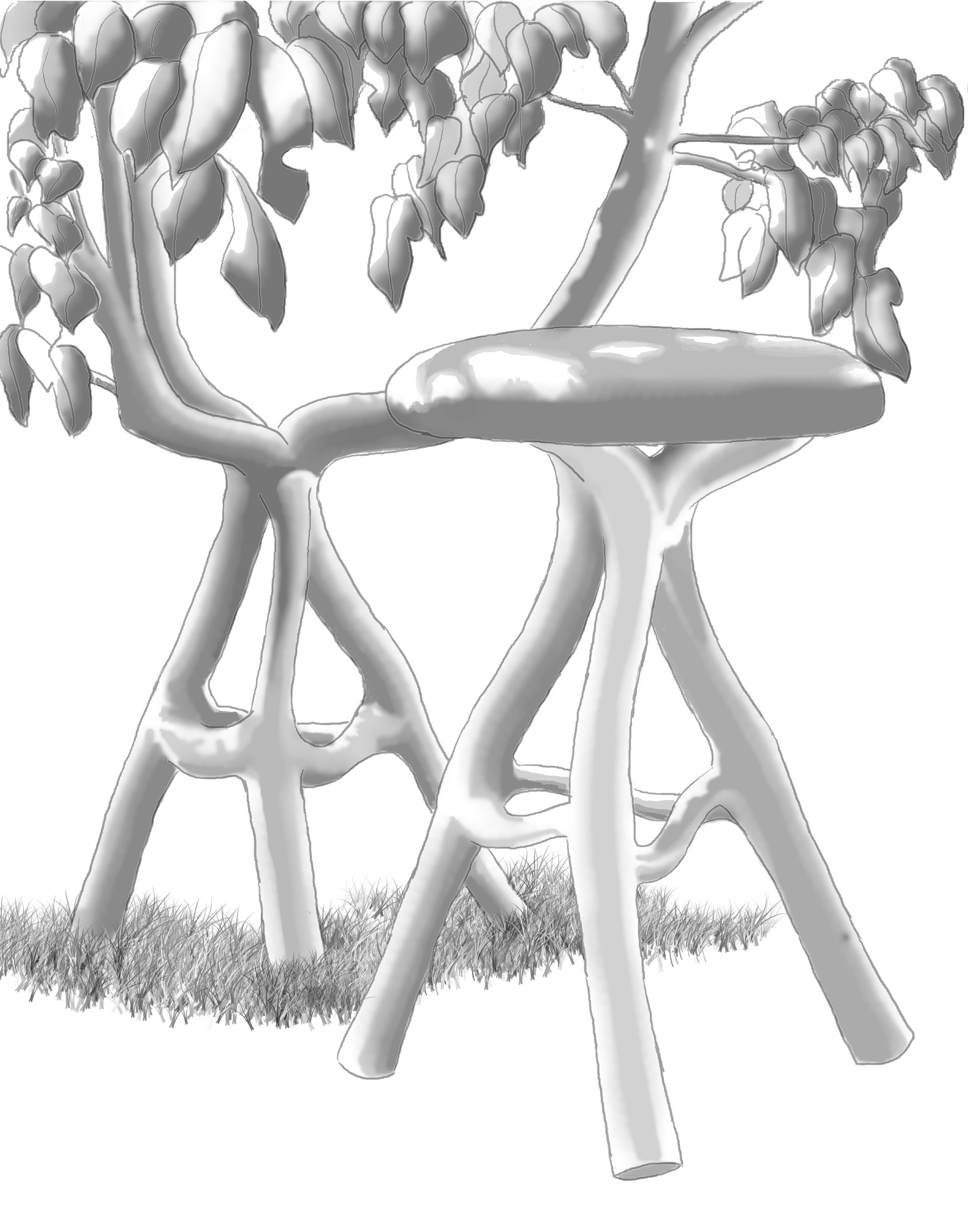
"Grownup furniture" by Chris Cattle

Gradual tree shaping as popularized by Pooktre starts with planning out the designing and framing. These are fundamental to the success of the piece. The designing stage can take hours to complete.

Once these are set up, young seedlings or saplings 3–12 in. (7.6–30.5 cm) long are planted. The training starts with young seedlings, saplings or the stems of trees when they are very young, which are gradually shaped while the tree is growing to form the desired shape. There is a small area just behind the growing tip that forms the final shape. The shaping zone, it is the shaping of this area requires day to day or weekly guiding of the new growth.This is best done in the spring and summer months. The growth is guided along predetermined design pathways; this may be a wooden jig or complex wire design that can be accurate almost to the millimetere. To achieve the chosen shape a deep understanding of the tree's growth patterns is necessary.

With this method the time frame is longer than the other methods but predictable. A chair design might take 8 to 10 years to reach maturity Some of Axel Erlandson's trees took as long as 40 years to assume their finished shapes. Given the amount of hands-on throughout this process the designer has a large amount of control, which would give maximum potential with architecture.

== Common techniques ==
=== Framing ===
Framing may be used for various purposes and might consist of any one or a combination of several materials, such as timber, steel, hollowed out trees, complex wire designs, wooden jigs, or the tree itself, living or dead. It can be used in many project designs to support grafted joints until the grafts are well-established. Some processes might employ framing to hold a shape created by bending or fletching mature trees until the tissues have overcome their resistance to the initial bending and grown enough annual rings to cast the design permanently. Others might use framing to support and shape the growth of young saplings until they are strong enough to maintain an intended shape without support. Aeroponic roots can be held in place with frames to form desired shapes.

An architecture example of framing that becomes part of the installation is Cathedral of Hornbeams. The growth of 80 young hornbeams trees is guided by the framing creating living columns. 1 meter in diameter and 12 meters high. The plan is once the wooden framing rots it becomes mulch for the living trees. Given the size of the trees the finished cathedral is expected to be 12 meters high, 80 meters by 8.7 meters.

=== Grafting ===
Grafting is a commonly employed technique that exploits the natural biological process of inosculation. A branch or plant is cut and a piece of another plant is added and held in place. Various types of grafting all share the goal of encouraging the tissues of one plant to fuse with those of another.

Grafting is applied to create permanent connections and joints. In some cases, trees are grafted while they are growing, while in other cases, mature trees may be intertwined and the stems of two or more trees are then grafted together to create chairs, ladders, and other fanciful sculptures.

=== Pruning ===
Pruning can be used to balance a design by controlling and directing growth into a desired shape. Pruning above a leaf node can steer plant growth in the direction of the natural placement of that leaf bud. Pruning may also be used to keep a design free of unwanted branches and to reduce canopy size. Pruning is sometimes the only technique used to craft a project. Deciduous trees are mainly pruned in winter, repeated over pruning of tree may stunt a tree or even kill it.

=== Timing ===
Using time as part of the construction is intrinsic to achieving this art form.

== Designing ==
The practitioners across this field have different approaches to how they design. From free form to very detailed drawings or designs. Designs can incorporate inclusions, can be for either structural reasons or for aesthetic. Some projects are for indoors and others outdoors or both.

Tree shaping projects are usually designed with an idea of whether they are going to remain living or going to be a harvested piece.

- One approach is for the harvested piece to be grown outside and once harvested it will be put to use as an interior object. A harvest piece will be dried and sometimes carved.
- Ezekiel Golan and Yale Stav use Aeroponic culture for their Ficus roots to create interior shaped forms for indoor use which are to remain growing while inside the home.
- Another design angle is to allow the trees of a project to mature in outside landscape and to remain living. Axel Erlandson and many others use this design style for their art.

== Tools ==
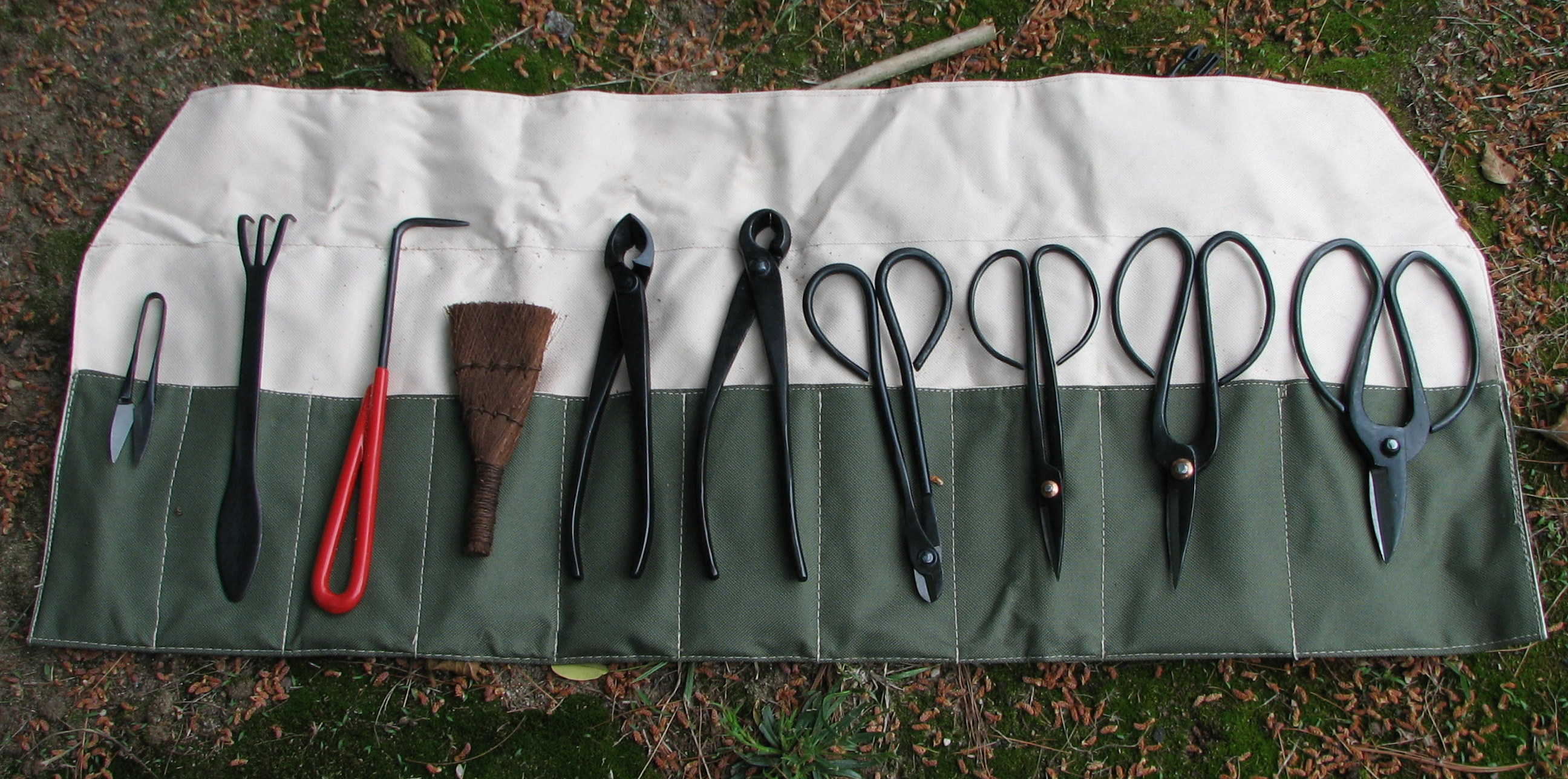
Bonsai tools can also be used

Various materials and tools may be used for creating, shaping, or molding a tree project. For example:- A wire frame can be created with fencing wire and tape or a metal patio bench could be used as a design pattern. Lumber, pipe, rope, wire, string, yarn, twine, wire rope, rocks, sandbags, or other weighting objects, tape, and any number of other materials might be useful in effecting the design outcome. Some of the same tools that arborists, bonsai artists, gardeners, and other horticulturists use, are useful here as well, including hand pruners (secateurs), pruning knives, saws, and shovels for planting. Shears and hedge trimmers are used less commonly, being perhaps better suited for establishment and foliage maintenance of topiary or sheared hedges.

== Tree species ==
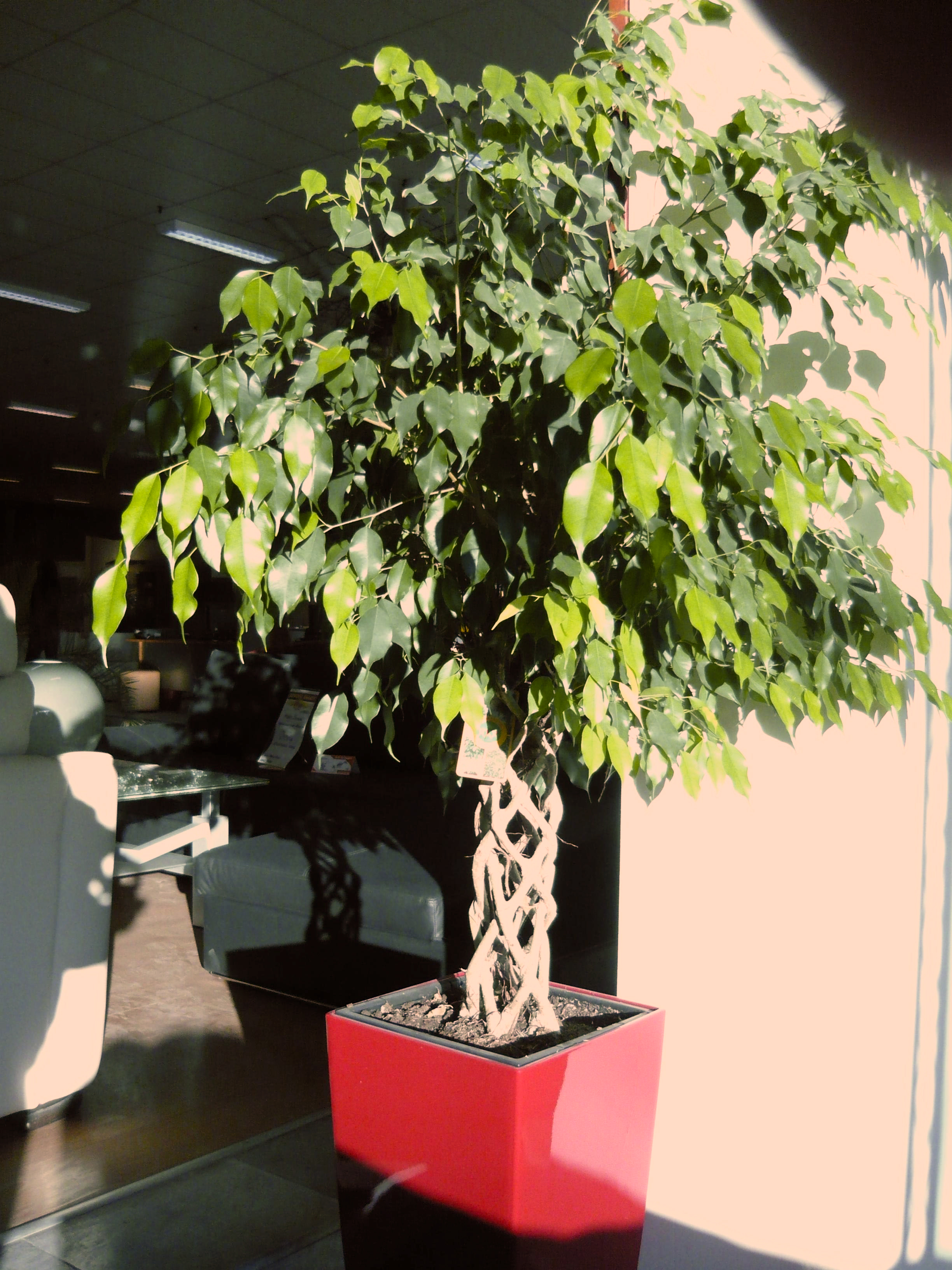
Woven Ficus-benjaminа

Tree shapers when looking for a new tree species to try generally look for trees that grow well in the area, are less prone to insect damage, and are less susceptible to disease. Given grafting and the trees ability of inosculation form a fundamental technique, trees that graft well are preferred in construction style projects. The region dictates which trees are primary of interest due to the geography and climate. The trees' traits like lifespan and adaptability are useful to understand. Any tree species has the potential for shaping. Each type of tree has its own quirks, but they can be understood with time and experience.

Fullgrown, is currently working with ash, sycamore, hazel, sessile omarkak, red oak, crab apple and the common osier willow used for basketwork. Experimentation has shown that, surprisingly, oak in its early Test pieces to try out finished shaping Successful early grafting experiment of young shoots Growing timber for furniture growth can produce as quickly as the willow. That is, a chair in 4–5 years. Gavin finds the best contender is sycamore.

Some of the trees that have been shaped include:

- Acer Maple
- Acer negundo Box Elder
- Acer palmatum Japanese Maple
- Alnus Alder
- Betula Birch
- Betula pendula White Birch
- Eucalyptus Eucalyptus
- Fagus Beech
- Ficus Fig
- Ficus benjamina has flexible roots and grows fast making it suitable for Aeroponic culture.
- Fraxinus Ash

Ash trees deal well with pollution and wind. They remain healthy in urban context, so are ideal when creating constructions with them.

- Lagerstroemia indica Crape myrtle
- Ligustrum Privet
- Malus Apple
- Pinus ponderosa Ponderosa pine
- Platanus Sycamore

Gavin Munro of Full Grown has found that Sycamore is working best for his shaping projects as it seems to be the most useful and prolific.

- Populus Poplar
- Prunus avium Cherry
- Prunus cerasifera Myrobalan Plum Pooktre artists have mainly been known to work with wild plum.
- Prunus serotina Black Cherry Pooktre artists have started working with the black Cherry and process has been successful so far.
- Psidium Guava
- Pyrus Pear
- Quercus Oak

At Full Grown Remarked oak can grow as quickly as willow. With early grafting it can be very successful for their different projects.

- Quercus suber Cork Oak
- Quercus virginiana Live Oak
- Robinia pseudoacacia Locust
- Salix Willow
- Salix babylonica Weeping Willow Willow with its strong growth pattern, will straighten itself from any shaped design.
- Ulmus Elm

== Related tree shaping practices ==
- Bonsai – Japanese art of miniature trees
- Topiary – Horticultural practice to shape trees and shrubs
- Espalier – Pruning/tying branches to flat structure
- Pleaching – Interwoven branches to form a hedge, fence or lattice

== See also ==
- Arthur Wiechula – Tree shaping theorist
- Christopher Cattle – British furniture designer and Tree shaping artist
- Richard Reames – American artist, arborsculptor, nurseryman, writer and public speaker
- Fab Tree Hab – Hypothetical Concept of ecological home design
- Gilroy Gardens – Family amusement and nature park
- Full Grown – Company that grows trees into furniture and sculpture
