= Christopher Cattle =

British furniture designer

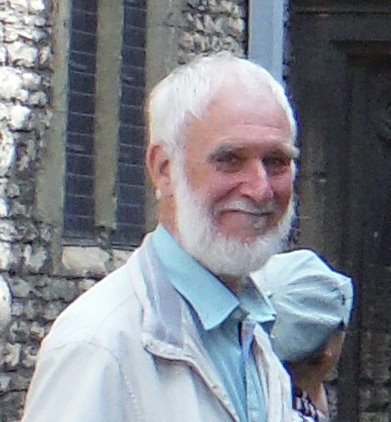
- Head and shoulder photo of Dr Chris Cattle
- Citizenship: England
- Occupations: Professor of furniture design, tree trainer, artist and teacher
- Writing career
- Language: English
- Genre: horticulture
- Subject: tree shaping
- Website: www.grown-furniture.co.uk

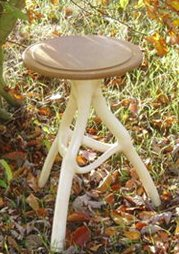
A grown stool in sycamore by Christopher Cattle

Christopher Cattle is a British furniture designer who has developed a process of growing furniture by shaping living trees. Cattle calls his work GrownUp Furniture but it is also known as Grown Furniture.

Cattle wanted to grow stools rather than create them from existing cut wood because with grown furniture, very little energy is required to convert a living tree into the finished piece of furniture, and very little pollution is created in the process. Cattle comments: "Growing furniture isn't going to save the planet, but it can show that it's possible to create genuinely useful things without adding to the pollution that industry inevitably seems to produce. Trees are self-generating, and the only energy needed is that which the sun provides worldwide. It's free and it's non-polluting. My aim though is to encourage as many people as possible to try it for themselves."

== Biography ==
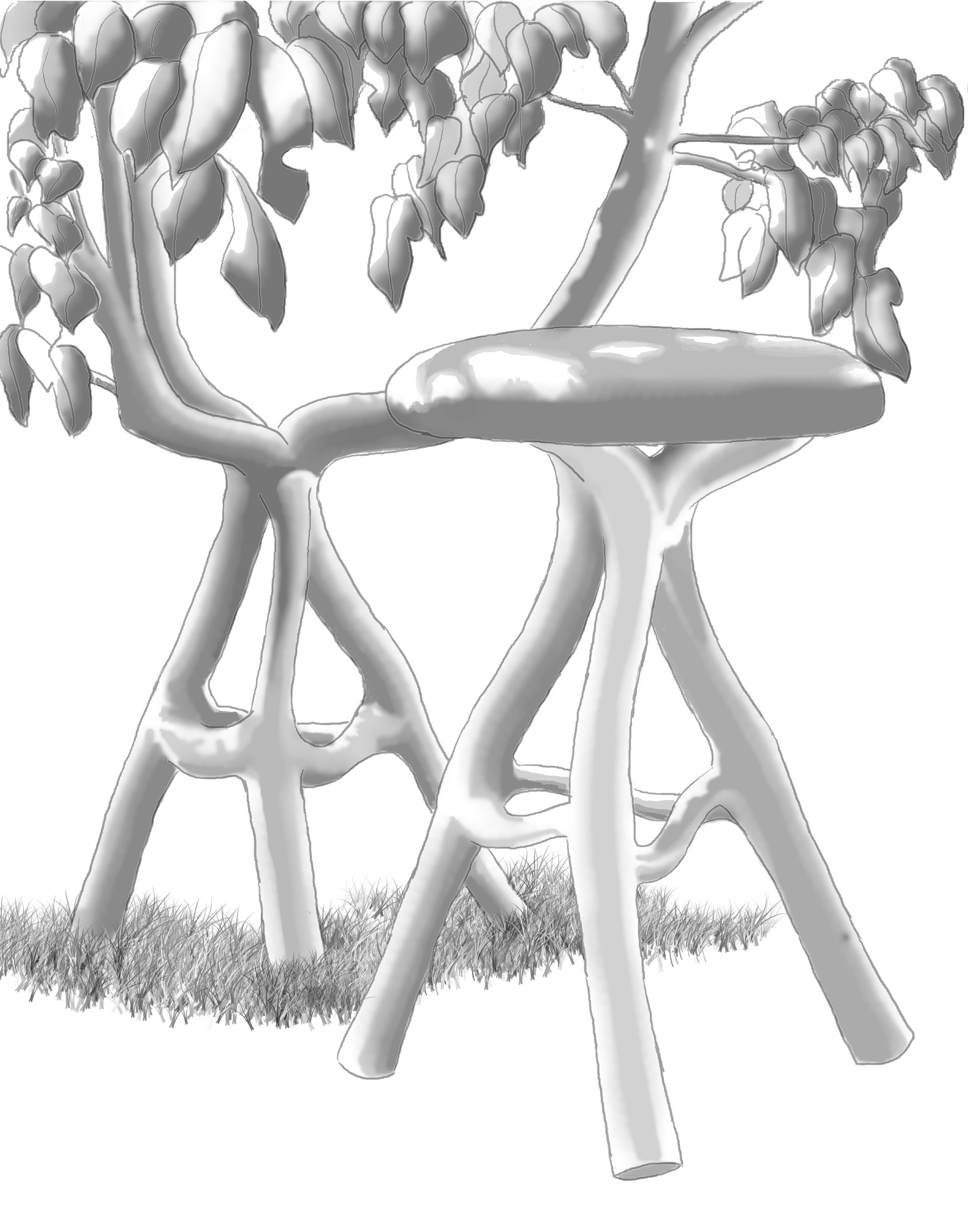
Two stools grown by Christopher Cattle, the background one is still growing, the foreground one is finished

Cattle lectured at High Wycombe in Furniture Design. In the late 1970s, he became interested in a way of making furniture that was more environmentally sustainable. He thought of growing, training and grafting trees to shape, and developed the concept into a 3-legged stool and tables. He encourages others to try growing their furniture.

Cattle has lectured at Buckinghamshire College on furniture design for 15 years. While pursuing his ideas as a PhD student at the Royal College of Art, he also lectured on a part-time basis.

In 2007, as part of the exhibition 'Going Green' held by the Museum of English Rural Life (MERL), Cattle gave a talk about his grown furniture, and explained how to train saplings on his plywood jigs. In 2008, MERL invited Cattle to demonstrate his art by installing six growing stools into MERL's garden. The MERL's Environmental Learning Officer Kathryn Robinson, as well as Thames Valley University students (a group with learning difficulties) and their teacher, helped Christopher Cattle to plant and maintain the growing furniture. The expected time frame of growing was 5 years, at which point the trees would be harvested to create the finished furniture.

== Exhibitions ==
Christopher Cattle has been successfully growing stools at several schools and museums in the UK. The stools have been exhibited in several woodland and craft shows in England, and at the 'Big Tent' at Falkland Palace in Scotland.

Cattle's finished stools have also been included in international exhibitions:

- 2005 World Expo 2005 Japan The theme of the Expo was "Nature's Wisdom"
- 2008 'Matieres a Cultiver' at the Avenue Daumesnil showrooms of VIA.
- 2008 Museum of English Rural Life
- 2009 Exhibition HABITAT ET JARDIN

== Process of tree shaping ==
In order to grow his stools, Christopher Cattle gradually shapes trees using a variety of horticultural, arboricultural, and artistic techniques. His first planting of saplings destined to become stools was in 1996. At that point he created his wooden jig as a framework for the saplings. He then intended to regrow more examples using the same design, to find out what the results would be.

== Tree types ==
Christopher Cattle has successfully grown his stool/table design using the following kinds of trees:

- Ash
- Sycamore
- Maple
- Alder
- Cherry
- Beech

== See also ==
- Topiary – Horticultural practice to shape trees and shrubs
- Espalier – Pruning/tying branches to flat structure
- Pleaching – Interwoven branches to form a hedge, fence or lattice
- Bonsai – Japanese art of miniature trees
- Arthur Wiechula – Tree shaping theorist
- Axel Erlandson – Farmer and Tree shaping artist
- Richard Reames – American artist, arborsculptor, nurseryman, writer and public speaker
- Fab Tree Hab – Hypothetical Concept of ecological home design
- Gilroy Gardens – Family amusement and nature park
- Full Grown – Company that grows trees into furniture and sculpture
