= Arthur Wiechula =

Tree shaping theorist

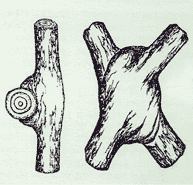
19th century botanical sketch by Arthur Wiechula of inosculated branches

Arthur Wiechula (January 20, 1867 – 1941) was a German landscape engineer. His marriage to Lydia Lindnau, produced three children, Margarethe (1895), Max (1897) and Ernst (1900).

He received the German Royal State Inventor's Honor Cross. In 1926, he published Wachsende Häuser aus lebenden Bäumen entstehend (Developing Houses from Living Trees) in German, describing simple building techniques involves guiding and grafting live branches together; including a system of v-shaped lateral cuts used to bend and curve individual trunks and branches in the direction of a design, with reaction wood soon closing the wounds to hold the curve.

He envisioned growing trees so that it constituted walls during growth, thereby enabling the use of young trees for building. He never built a living home, but he grew a 394-foot (120 m) wall of Canadian poplars to help keep the snow off a section of train tracks. His illustrated ideas have inspired many other artists to attempt to grow a house of trees.

== See also ==
- Tree shaping – Use of living trees to create structures and art
- Topiary – Horticultural practice to shape trees and shrubs
- Espalier – Pruning/tying branches to flat structure
- Pleaching – Interwoven branches to form a hedge, fence or lattice
- Bonsai – Japanese art of training plants to mimic miniature versions of large trees
- Axel Erlandson – Farmer and Tree shaping artist
- Christopher Cattle – British furniture designer and Tree shaping artist
- Richard Reames – American artist, arborsculptor, nurseryman, writer and public speaker
- Fab Tree Hab – Hypothetical Concept of ecological home design
- Gilroy Gardens – Family amusement and nature park
- Full Grown – Company that grows trees into furniture and sculpture
