= Full Grown =

Company that grows trees into furniture and sculpture

Full Grown is a UK company that grows trees into chairs, sculptures, lamps, mirror frames and tables. It was co-founded by Gavin Munro in 2005.

== History ==
In 2005 with a £5,000 investment Gavin Munro started to experiment with willow to grow chairs. The original idea came from Gavin's childhood memory of an overgrown bonsai that looked like a small throne. The inspiration lead to growing trees into chairs, sculptures, lamps, mirror frames and tables.

The idea of growing trees for 50 years then cut them into small pieces glue together in ways that can only ever fall apart didn't seem to make much sense. Better to grow the trees into one solid piece. For example, a chair or a light shade. Ideally the tree would have the ability to re-shoot and in this way yield furniture the way an apple tree in an orchard does.

Working together with his wife Alice Munro. The concept is to train young trees to grow over plastic molds until maturity. Thereby creating no wood waste. This process can take up to eight years to mature.

2006 Full Grown started planting trees to grow furniture. On a 2.5 acre field around 3,000 trees have been planted with production getting underway in late 2011.

The first prototype, The Vaila Chair, was revealed in a TEDx talk in Derby in 2014.

== Gavin Munro ==
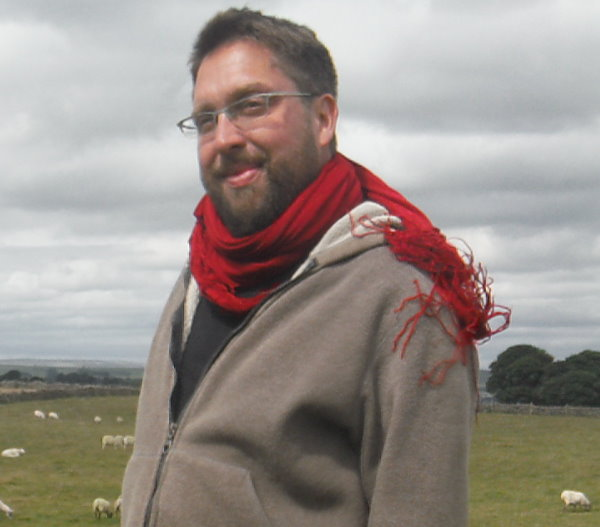
Gavin Munro

Gavin Munro was born in Matlock England. He studied furniture design. He created driftwood furniture while in San Francisco. Munro's mother in-law allowed the first prototypes of chairs to be grown in her garden. He co-founded Full Grown and is the managing director.

== Full Grown in 2017 ==
In a two-acre field north of Derby Full Grown is currently tending 400 trees. They are only making 50 or so pieces a year. The first batch was to be harvested in 2015 The bulk of the pre-orders are from outside the UK, most in France and the US with some orders from London, Hong Kong, Germany and Spain, though they will need to have patience as the grown chairs may take as long as 10 years before they are harvested, dried and finished.

Full Grown are using permaculture ideas to help with pest control and tending the field.

== Design ==
The chairs are based on 18th century "Shaker" with some mid-century Scandinavian design centering around the idea the function is intrinsic to usefulness. The chairs are grown upside down.

== Process of tree shaping ==
The trees are trained along pre-defined routes following a blue plastic mold. The growing tip is shaped and held in place with small plastic clasps. The trees are gently manipulated to create the exact shape of chairs, tables, mirror frames or lamps. You can't force the trees as a tortured branch dies back and will reshoot elsewhere. The shaping can be inch-by-inch over the span of a few years. One tree has been planted specifically to grow each piece. Some of the pieces use grafting as part of the design. This process of growing the piece take somewhere between 4–8 years. During this time a piece thickens and matures before being harvested in the winter. Over several months the pieces are dried and seasoned. They are planed, cleaned back and polished to show the wood grain.

== Items growing/grown ==
- Chairs
- Tables
- Lampshades
- Mirror frames

== Tree types ==
Gavin Munro’s company Full Grown uses the following species of trees: They mainly use willow as it grows fast and is relatively easy to work with. They like the idea of offering other varieties such as cherry, oak and Gavins personal choice of ash. Partly to give a range of choice for customers and also to spread the risk of disease. Ash is very prone to fungal disease and die back."

To grow a finished chair takes about four to five years with willow. It can take nine or more years to grow a chair in oak.

- Ash
- Willow
- Oak
  - Sessile oak
  - Red oak
- Sycamore
- Crab apple
- Hazel

Full Grown had originally used saplings as the base of the tree, but seeing only 1 out of 50 manifests properly, they have switched to using coppicing in 2011.

== See also ==
- Topiary – Horticultural practice to shape trees and shrubs
- Espalier – Pruning/tying branches to flat structure
- Pleaching – Interwoven branches to form a hedge, fence or lattice
- Arthur Wiechula – Tree shaping theorist
- Axel Erlandson – Farmer and Tree shaping artist
- Christopher Cattle – British furniture designer
- Richard Reames – American artist, arborsculptor, nurseryman, writer and public speaker
- Fab Tree Hab – Hypothetical Concept of ecological home design
- Horticulture – Small-scale cultivation of plants
- Landscape ecology – Relationships between ecological processes in the environment and particular ecosystems
- List of companion plants
- Naturescaping – Method of landscape design that involves incorporating native plants into one's yard
- Sustainable gardening
- Sustainable planting – Agricultural philosophy
- Climate-friendly gardening – Gardening practices that aim to reduce and mitigate climate change
