= Richard Reames =

American artist, arborsculptor, nurseryman, writer and public speaker

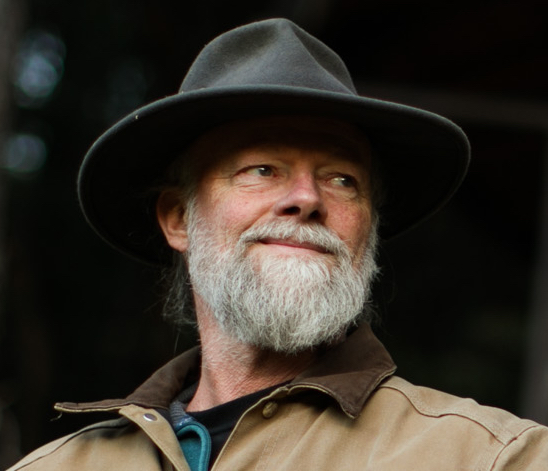
- Richard Reames in 2016
- Born: September 20, 1957 (age 69)
- Occupations: Arborsculptor, nursery owner, writer
- Spouse: Maya Many Moons Reames
- Children: Myray Reames
- Writing career
- Language: English
- Genre: Horticulture
- Subject: Arborsculpture
- Notable works: How to Grow a Chair: The Art of Tree Trunk Topiary with Barbara Delbol (1995); Arborsculpture: Solutions for a Small Planet (2005)
- Movements: Environmental art, Environmental humanities
- Website: www.arborsmith.com

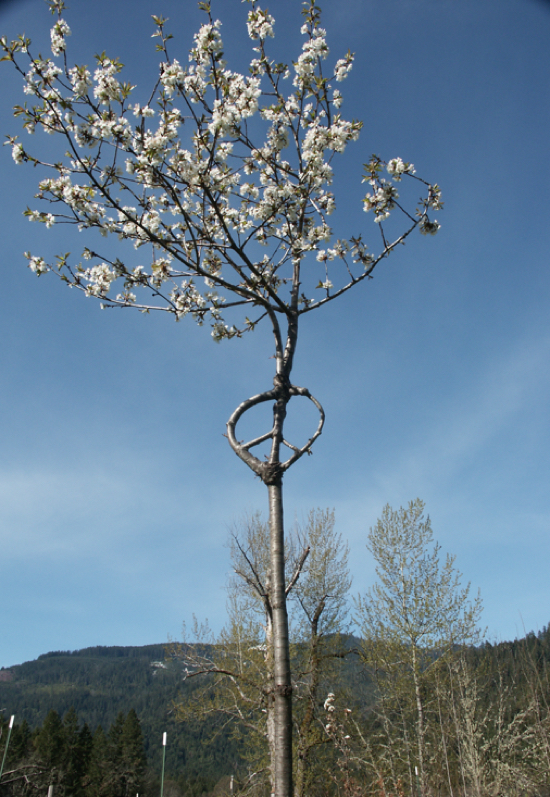
Peace in Cherry, Spring 2002

Richard C. Reames (born September 20, 1957) is an American artist, arborsculptor, nurseryman, writer, and public speaker. He lives and works in Williams, Oregon.

Reames coined the word "arborsculpture" to describe the art of shaping living tree trunks and woody plants into sculptural forms, furniture and shelters. His writing and artistic practice are grounded in ecological principles of living in harmony with nature and with creating living structures from trees. He has written two books on arborsculpture and tree shaping.

Reames was appointed, in 2005, as the "international arborsculpture coordinator" for the World Expo's Growing Village in Aichi, Japan; his work was also exhibited there.

== Biography ==
Richard Reames was born in 1957. He grew up near Santa Cruz, California, which is within ten miles of Axel Erlandson's famed "Circus Trees," known at that time as The Lost World, a mid-century roadside attraction.

Reames's mother showed him the value of working with nature including vegetable gardening. Reames studied horticulture, biology, botany and log-house building in college, however the structure of the educational establishment did not appeal to him. He traveled the country by hitchhiking or by road-tripping in a 1969 Chevy van for over a decade. Throughout this time he worked as an itinerant landscaper. Reames has stated "I was volunteer homeless. A real gypsy." During the times he was not on road trips, he made a living selling wild herbs and mushrooms he foraged through his knowledge of wildcrafting.

In 1991, he met Maya Many Moons in southwest Oregon. They settled down in Williams, Oregon near the border of Klamath National Forest, where they bought land in cooperation with another couple. Over a period of three years he constructed an octagonal two-story log house, 24 feet in diameter, using dead standing trees and native stone for the foundation. Reames and Many Moons have a daughter named Myray Reames. During this time he founded Arborsmith Studios.

== Work ==
Reames uses basic tools and ancient grafting techniques to produce his works of arborsculpture, furniture and functional objects. His work involves the time-based processes of bending, pruning, grafting, and multiple plantings that are similar to those used in bonsai but most closely related to espalier.

In an interview with Joshua Foer in Cabinet Magazine, Reames describes some of the ecological principles behind his work as being grounded in a desire to teach others ways to live in harmony with trees and therefore with nature. He is interested in ecological advantages of working with trees such as erosion control, carbon dioxide sequestration, food sources, habitat creation for wildlife, and climate change mitigation.

One of his primary inspirations was the work of Axel Erlandson, and his Tree Circus, and John Krubsack, known for his Living Chair. In 1993, with Erlandson in mind, he started Arborsmith Studios, a tree nursery and outdoor art studio. Other influences include the 18th century Swedish mystic Emanuel Swedenborg, the 19th century Austrian mystic, Jakob Lorber, and modern pioneers of arborsculptural tree shaping such as Arthur Wiechula among others. Reames was also intrigued with the organic architecture of Frank Lloyd Wright, whose work "bring[s] nature into the house."

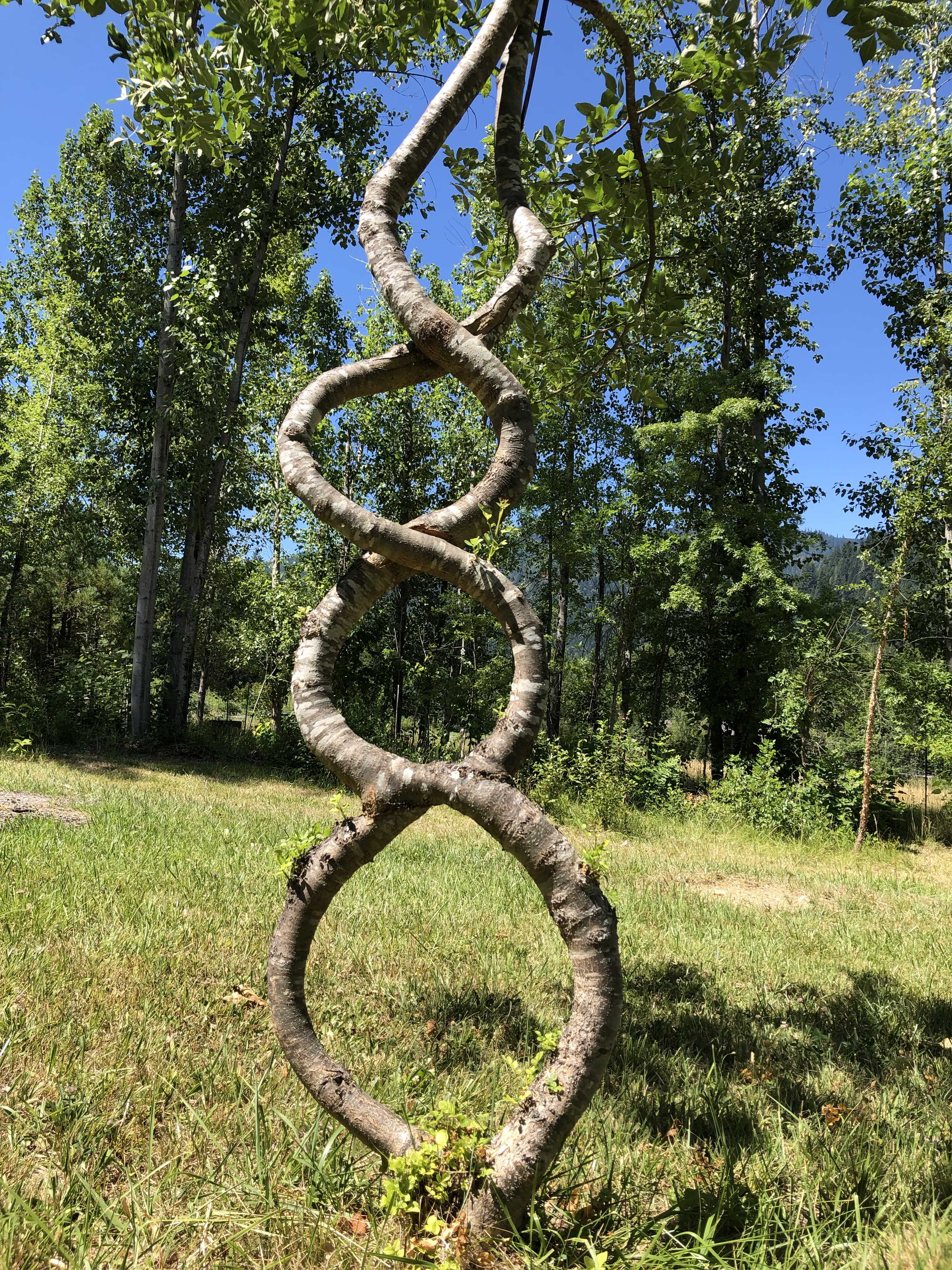
Ash Rings arborsculpture, in July 2021

In 2000, together with the people of the town of Jōkōji, Japan, he and John Gathright planted 1100 trees, which, combined with existing trees, created the "Laughing Happy Tree Park." The environmental installation included a living tree house with living furniture.

Some of his arborsculptures were exhibited at the Growing Village Pavilion of the World Expo 2005 in Nagakute, Aichi, Japan. The producer and organizer of the project was John Gathright. Reames participated as a team member of the Growing Village Pavilion, and in 2005, he was appointed the international arborsculpture coordinator, overseeing the work of artists from several countries.

Reames has lectured internationally on arborsculpture, and gives live demonstrations of bending and weaving a chair at garden shows, fairs and folk art festivals throughout the U.S.

Reames, like the artist Konstantin Kirsch, has been exploring sustainable, living architecture using tree branches to form latticeworks that can be trained and designed into cylindrical, multi-room dwellings. These botanical domes or self-growing treehouses can form a sustainable abode that grows fruit and other edible foods, and can also utilize waste within a closed-loop system. The German language book, Lebende Bauten - trainierbare Tragwerke (Living buildings - trainable structures) features a chapter on Reames.

After the publication of his first book, How to Grow a Chair: The Art of Tree Trunk Topiary (1995), he was invited to create site-specific arborsculptures by various clients, who he then mentors on the care of the living installations. His arborsculptures have been created in gardens throughout the West Coast.

In 2023, Reames worked with a group of 40 others to plant a Sequoia-Sanctuary a major work of land art in the Pacifica Preserve in Oregon, in the form of a circle of 114 sequoia seedling trees, three-feet apart, in a 100-foot diameter. When fully grown the environmental sculpture will create a 7,000 square-foot "sanctuary" space of intertwined branches. The variety of sequoia seedlings that were planted are the endangered Sequoiadendron giganteum, giant sequoia which can live as long as 3,000 years.

== Arborsculpture ==
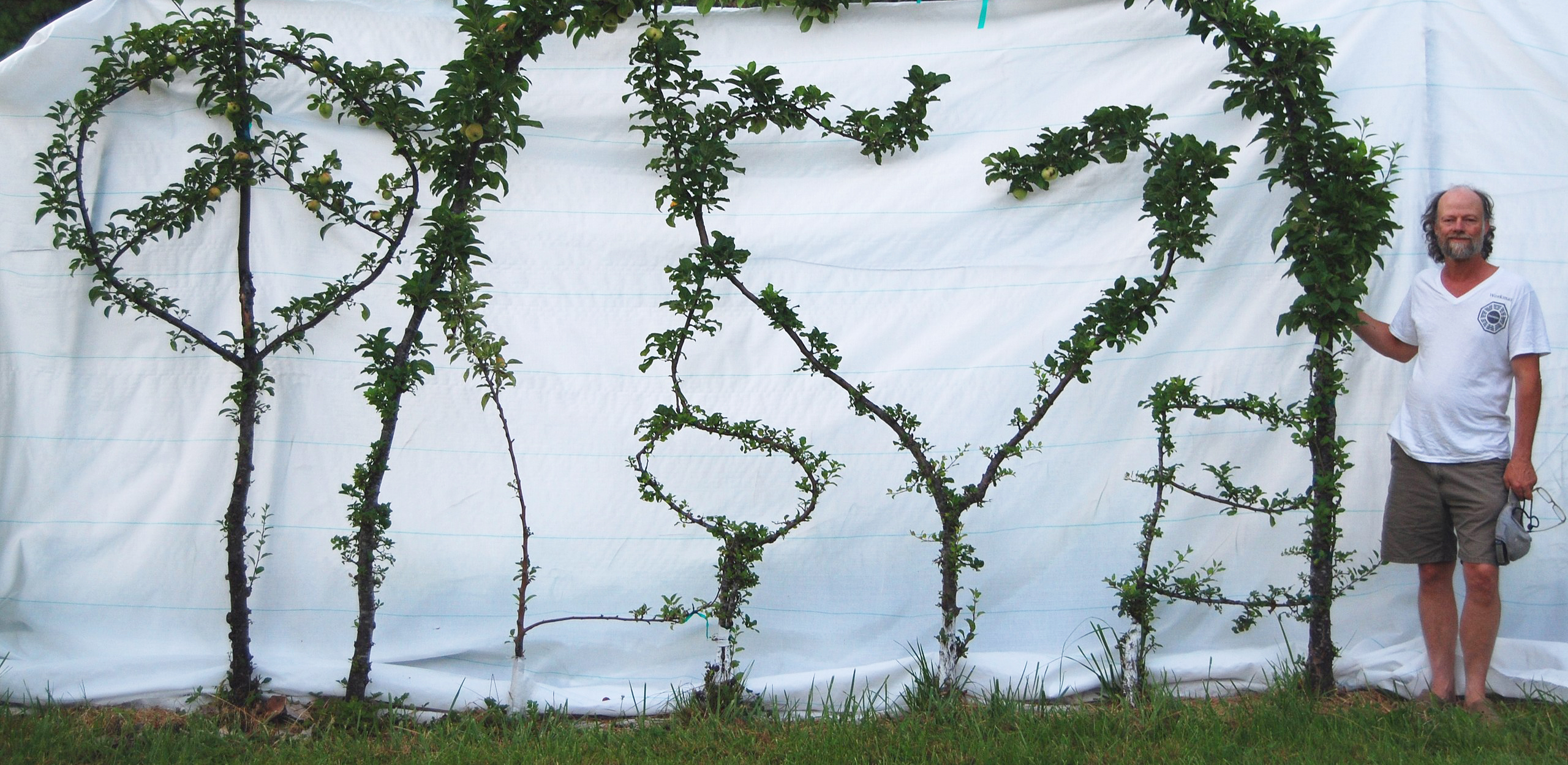
Arborsculpture of peace and love, in 2016

In 1995, Reames coined the word "arborsculpture" to describe tree-trunk sculptural modifications as art. The word has since been used by several writers, creative practitioners and scholars. Arborsculpture has also been called "arbor sculpture" and "arborisculpture". In French it is known as l'arborisculpture), and in German arborsculpture is known as Baumplastiken. Reames refers to the use of arborsculpture to produce architectural structures or dwellings as "arbortecture", it has also been called "arborarchitecture" by Olga O. Smolina who has written on arborsculpture and on Reames. Arbortecture is called Baumarchitektur in German.

Reames uses arborsculptural tree bending and shaping techniques to create his work and also uses the horticultural and arboricultural techniques of ring barking, approach grafting, pruning, and framing, in various combinations, to craft his artworks and functional objects.

Reames has described his arborsculpture tree shaping practice:

Arborsculpture is a unique art form that has been called the ultimate branch of topiary with the potential to save the environment. There are other words and terms that are used to describe this art. Pleaching, grafting, permaculture, tree trunk topiary, botanical art, botanical architecture, biotechture, living art, visionary art, and really weird.

— Richard Reames

When making architectural arborsculptures such as fences, Reames prefers using the diamond pattern, a structurally sound design. This technique has been used by traditional Belgian fence crafters however Reames creates a tighter diamond grid by planting the trees closer together to keep certain wildlife such as deer out of an area. He has also made gazebos and a Fruit Room; the latter was created by espaliering together apple, plum, cherry and pear trees. Another arbortectural project is his Living House, a 22-foot diameter dwelling created from 77 alder trees planted 11 inches apart, intentionally based on multiples of elevens.

=== Process and technique ===
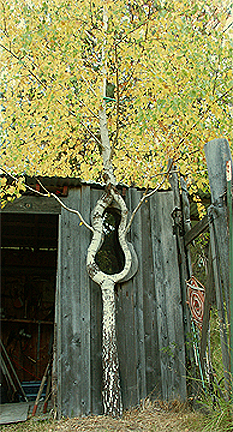
Birch Window Frame arborsculpture, September 2006

On Reames' property in Oregon, there are a dozen nursery beds, each of which are between 100 and 200 feet long, constructed in a configuration to optimize their orientation to the sun. The beds are filled with thousands of tree saplings, which he refers to as "art supplies." Saplings are transplanted from November to March, the dormant season for working with bare-root trees. In winter through early spring, the tree trunks are sculpted by bending, weaving and twisting as this is the time of year they are most pliable. The young trees are then attached to a metal or wood support structure until they are mature enough to retain their shape without support.

=== History of arborsculptural practices ===
The medieval and post-medieval English scholar, Kathleen Kelly, identifies both modern and medieval examples of arborsculptures. In her paper, Anthophilia and the Medieval Ecologies of Grafting, she cites the work of Axel Erlandson as exemplary of "extreme grafting as art" to produce "astonishing arborsculptures". She also places a painting from circa 1410, Paradiesgärtlein (The Littile Garden of Paradise) by Meister des Frankfurter Paradiesgärtleins an unknown medieval painter who is also known as the Upper Rhenish Master, as an example of aesthetic inarched grafting of tree trunks. The painting, which is in the collection of the Städel Museum, depicts Dorothea of Caesarea, the patron saint of gardeners, picking fruit from a tree.

The science journalist James Nestor writes that "Arborsculpture is the art of shaping living trees into furniture, sculpture, and shelters. Part grazing and grafting, pleaching and patience, it exists in the shady area between landscaping, gardening, and furniture design." Nestor states that arborsculpture can be traced back to a 16th-century illuminated manuscript painting by Jean Perréal, La Complainte de Nature à l'Alchimiste Errant (The Lament of Nature to the Wandering Alchemist) that depicts a lavish "living chair". Reames' interpretation of the painting is that the angel is criticizing the alchemist for attempting to make gold out of lead, when nature herself can make fruit out of dirt.

In the book, Between Earth and Sky: Our Intimate Connections to Trees, the author Nalini M. Nadkarni, an ecosystem ecologist, wrote that gardeners who practice arborsculpture have "vision, patience, and humor" and names Axel Erlandson as the "grand old man of arborsculpture."

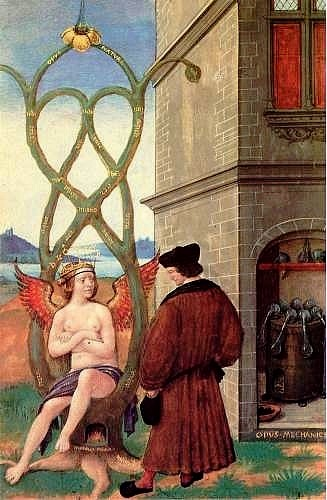
La Complainte de la Nature à l'Alchimiste Errant, (1516), Jean Perréal

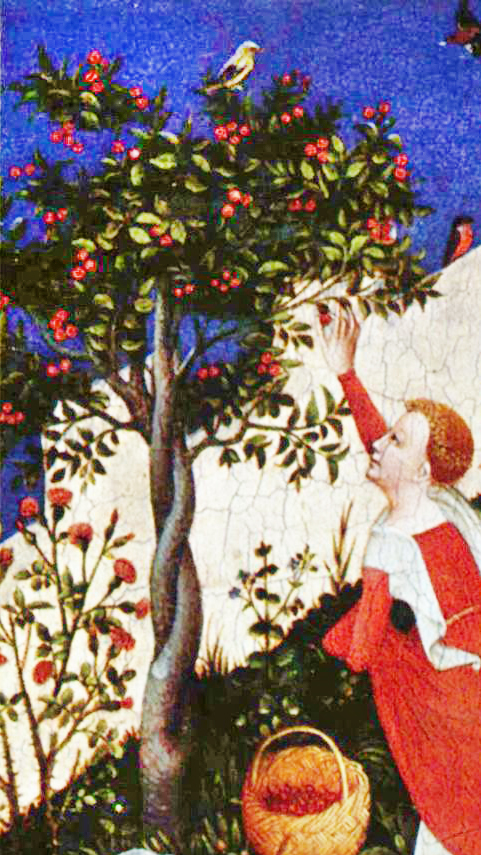
Detail, Paradiesgärtlein (Little Garden of Paradise), (c. 1410), Upper Rhenish Master

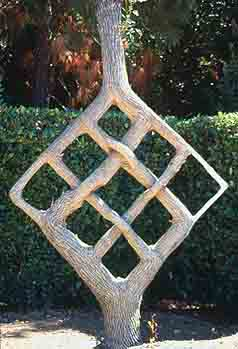
Needle and thread tree by Axel Erlandson whose work influenced Reames

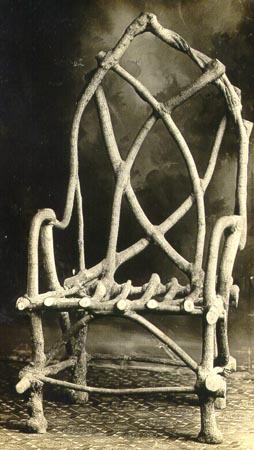
John Krubsack's Chair that Grew (in 1915), his work inspired Reames

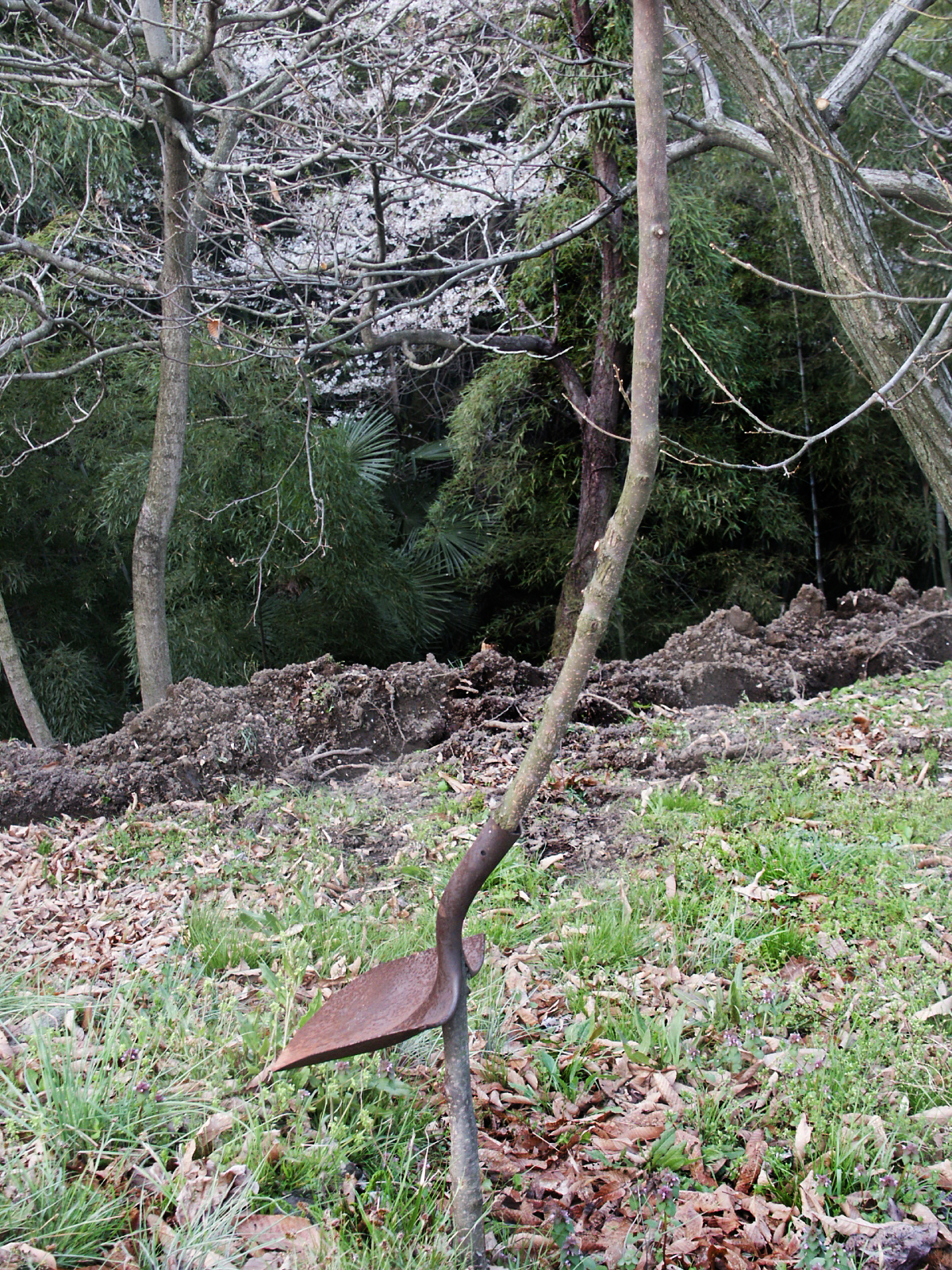
Reames growing a tool handle in the Laughing Happy Tree Park in Jōkōji Japan, May 2002

=== Sustainable design applications ===
Reames believes that "arbortecture" is the future of arborsculpture. Arbotecture is a viable green alternative in urban design. According to Reames, arbor-architects (Baumarchitekten) can design and build energy-efficient structures that have a reciprocal "exchange with the natural environment" and that these dwellings should be planned specifically for a location and environment. He has stated that he believes that the natural environment should enter into the house, and the interior of the building can extend outdoors. Alison Gillespie writes in her article, Taking treehouses to a whole new level in the journal Frontiers in Ecology and the Environment, that arborsculpture is not a new practice but when combined with aeroponics it can be used for sustainable design applications.

== Publications ==
In 1995, Reames published the book How to Grow a Chair: The Art of Tree Trunk Topiary with Barbara Delbol co-authoring. The book details his process of shaping trees to create chairs, benches fences, and other structures.

In 2005, Reames published the book Arborsculpture: Solutions for a Small Planet, that describes the history of tree and woody plant shaping, and elaborates on a selection of practitioners in the field of tree shaping.

Reames has written for Compass Magazine in the March/April 2006 issue.

=== Reception ===
Reames' books have been called "reference books" by Vallas and Courard in the journal, Frontiers of Architectural Research. The authors go on to state that Reames has "inspired many architects,"

His book, Arborsculpture: Solutions for a Small Planet was reviewed in the Utne Reader.

== See also ==
- Environmental art – Art genre engaging nature and ecology
- Ecological art – Genre of art engaging ecological systems
- Tree shaping – Use of living trees to create structures and art
- Gilroy Gardens – Family amusement and nature park
- Fab Tree Hab – Hypothetical Concept of ecological home design
- Full Grown – Company that grows trees into furniture and sculpture
- Christopher Cattle – British furniture designer
