= David Nash (artist) =

English sculptor (born 1945)

- Born: 14 November 1945 (age 80); Esher, Surrey, England
- Education: Kingston College of Art
- Occupation: Sculptor
- Known for: Wooden Boulder
- Title: OBE

David John Nash, OBE RA (born 14 November 1945) is a British sculptor based in Blaenau Ffestiniog. Nash has worked worldwide with wood, trees and the natural environment.

== Early life ==
David Nash was born at Esher, Surrey, and raised with his older brother Chris in Weybridge, Surrey where they both attended preparatory school. He spent all his childhood holidays in Ffestiniog, Wales David helped clear and replant a nearby forest that his father owned, and also worked for the Commercial Forestry Group. He learned about wood of many kinds and learned he hated planting trees in rows.

== Artistic career ==
He attended Brighton College from 1959 to 1963, then Kingston College of Art from 1963 to 1967 and the Chelsea School of Art as a postgraduate from 1969 to 1970. Nash was elected a member of the Royal Academy of Arts in 1999. In 2004, he was awarded the Order of the British Empire. A significant exhibition of his work is displayed in the Yorkshire Sculpture Park for a period in 2010/11.

Kew Gardens currently has a working exhibition, launched in June 2012. David Nash is working on site in a 'wood quarry', his first for 10 years, to create new works at Kew.

== Artistic creations ==
David Nash is known for works in wood and shaping living trees. His large wood sculptures are sometimes carved or partially burned to produce blackening. His main tools for these sculptures are a chainsaw and an axe to carve the wood and a blowtorch to char the wood.

Nash also makes land art, of which the best known is Wooden Boulder, begun in 1978. This work involves the journey of a large wooden sphere from a Welsh mountainside to the Atlantic Ocean. Wooden Boulder is a large wooden sphere carved by Nash in the North Wales landscape and left there to weather. Over the years, the boulder has slipped, rolled and sometime been pushed through the landscape following the course of streams and rivers until finally it was last seen in the estuary of the river Dwyryd. It was thought to have been washed out to sea but, after being missing for over five years, the boulder reappeared in June 2009. Indications are that it had been buried in sand in the estuary. The sculptor had no idea of its location, and enjoys the notion that wood which grew out of the land will finally return to it. The boulder was last seen in 2015.

Nash also makes sculptures which stay in the landscape. For example, Ash Dome is a ring of ash trees he planted in 1977 and trained to form a domed shape.

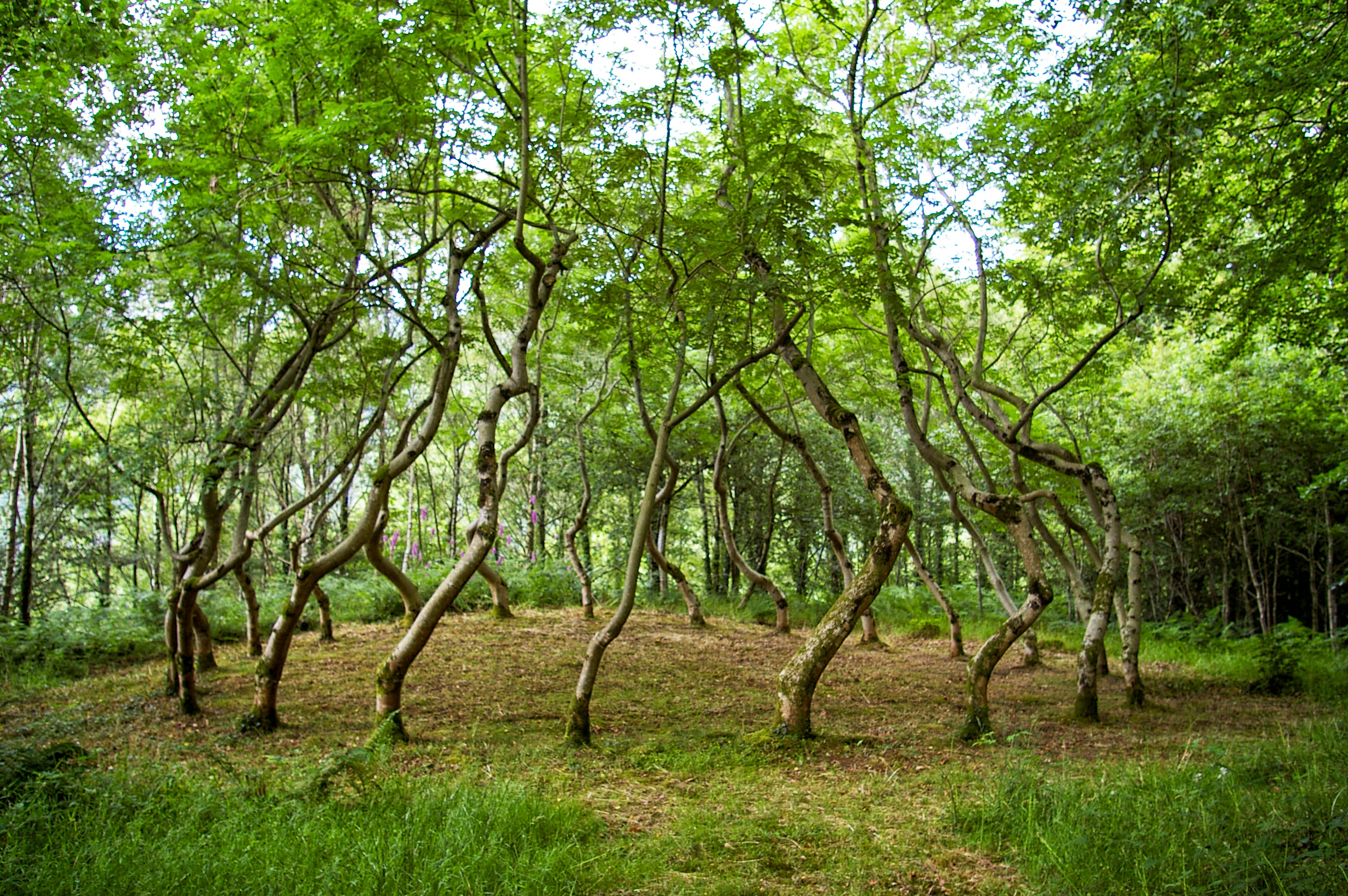
Ash Dome - Living Sculpture by David Nash photographed in July 2009

The dome is sited at a secret location somewhere in Snowdonia and whenever it is filmed, crews are taken there by a circuitous route to guard its security.

In the late 1980s, Nash worked at the Djerassi resident artist program, near Woodside, California, where he used Redwood and Madrone wood for his sculptures. Nash has worked with schools, university groups, and teachers throughout his career. He has created a varied body of work in which the relationship between man and nature is a central theme. His artistic ethos has been one of direct, physical involvement with his chosen material – wood – and the landscape.

Since 1967, his sculpture has formed two distinctive groupings; sculptures which connect with the outside, the landscape of making and placements, and works which are presented inside, within and in relation to, architectural environments. The inorganic, non-allusive sculptures that Nash makes using unseasoned wood are based on the universal geometry of the cube, the sphere and the pyramid. He uses the directions of mark-making to his favoured forms: vertical for the cube, horizontal for the sphere, and diagonal for the pyramid. Although the innate character of the material is taken into account, and allowed to affect the outcome, he never allows it to dictate the sculpture's final identity.

Nash takes a different approach to carving. Rather than chisels and abrasives, he uses chain saws and a blowtorch.

For his work habitat received the 2016 Marsh Award for Excellence in Public Sculpture.

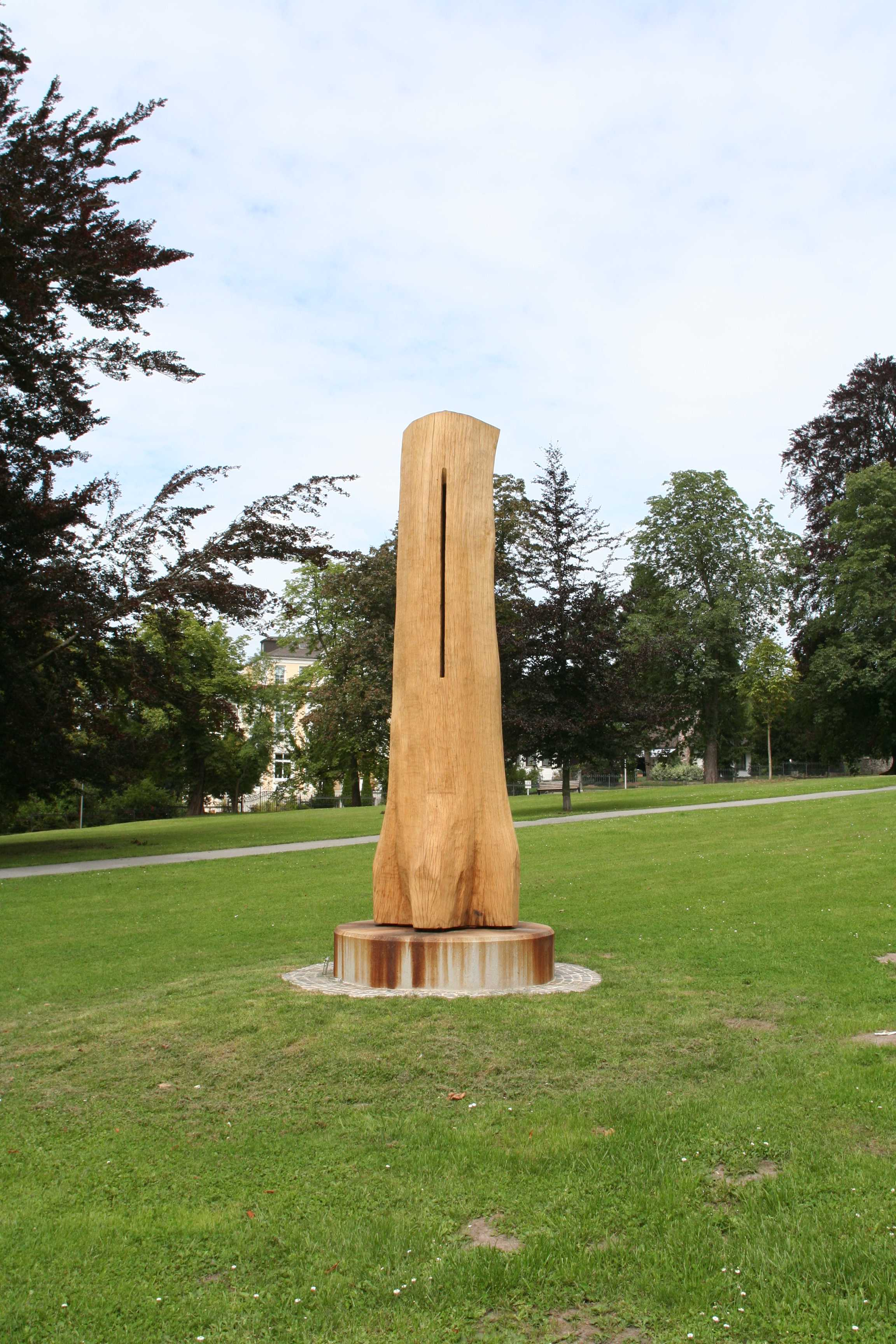
Noon Column in Coburg

== Recent solo exhibitions ==
- 2020 : Red, Black & Blue, Galerie Lelong & Co., 38 avenue Matignon, Paris, France
- 2019 : David Nash: Sculpture through the Seasons, National Museum Cardiff, Cardiff, Wales
- 2019 : Trees, Galerie Lelong & Co., Paris, France
- 2016 : Columns, Peaks and Torso, Galerie Lelong & Co., Paris, France
- 2012 : Black and Red : Bronze & Wood, Galerie Lelong & Co., Paris, France
- 2012 : Pastels and Sculptures, Galerie Lelong & Co., Zurich, Switzerland
- 2011 : Yorkshire Sculpture Park, Wakefield, England
- 2010 : Royal Academy, London, England
- 2009 : Drawings and Sculpture Abbot Hall Art Gallery, Kendal, & Blackwell, Bowness, Cumbria, England

== See also ==
- Grizedale Arts
- Instant tree shaping
