= Axel Erlandson =

Farmer and Tree shaping artist

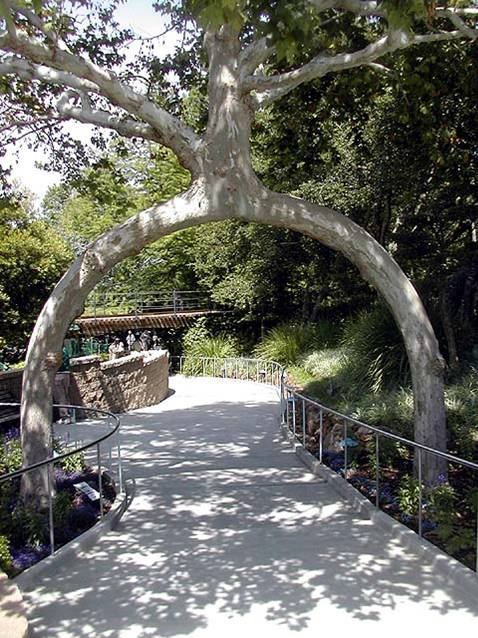
Two Leg Tree

Axel Erlandson (December 15, 1884 – April 28, 1964) was a Swedish American farmer who shaped trees as a hobby, and opened a horticultural attraction in 1947 called "The Tree Circus", advertised with the slogan "See the World's Strangest Trees Here".

The trees appeared in the column of Robert Ripley's Believe It or Not! twelve times. Erlandson sold his attraction shortly before his death. The trees were moved to Gilroy Gardens in 1985.

== Biography ==
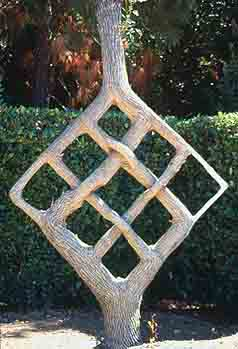
Needle and Thread Tree

Erlandson was born in 1884, in Halland, Sweden, to Alfred Erlandson (1850–1915) and Kristina Larsson (1844–1922). He had two older brothers, Ludwig (1879–1957) and Anthon (1881–1970), and one younger sister, Emma Swanson (1886–1969). The family emigrated to the United States in early 1886, settling in New Folden Township, Marshall County, Minnesota, where his father farmed and built barns, homes, and churches. His family also ran a limestone kiln, producing quicklime for mortar, plaster, and whitewash. Limestone rocks were collected from the surrounding fields and the men and boys kept the kiln fires going 24 hours a day during the processing time.

As a young boy, Axel produced a working model of a threshing machine, but was disappointed when told by his parents that he could not take it along when they moved to California. In 1902, the family loaded their possessions into a rented box car and moved with a couple of other Swedish families to live at Hilmar, a new Evangelical Covenant Church colony in the Central Valley of California promising irrigated land for farming operations.

He married his wife, Leona Bobbett (1896-1978), in 1914 and they had one daughter, Wilma. He farmed outside of Hilmar, near his parents, raising beans and other crops. There, inspired by having observed a natural inosculation in his own hedgerow, he began in 1925 to shape trees as a hobby to amuse himself and his family. Very few people other than his sister and a few close family friends knew of his early work shaping and grafting trees. He created designs on paper first and then planted small trees in the specified patterns; pruning, grafting and bending them according to his plans. Erlandson taught himself over a period of decades how to train the growth of trees into shapes of his own design. He considered his methods trade secrets. When children asked how he got his trees to grow like this, he would reply, "I talk to them."

== The Tree Circus ==
The "Basket Tree"

In 1945, Erlandson's daughter and his wife visited the ocean near Santa Cruz, California, where they saw people lined up to pay to see such oddities as tilted buildings at the Mystery Spot. They returned home and mentioned offhandedly to Axel that if his trees were on a well-traveled tourist route, they might draw people who would pay to see them. Axel jumped on the idea and bought a small parcel of land, on the main road between the Santa Clara Valley and the ocean, in Scotts Valley, California, where he started the process of transplanting the best of his trees to their new home. To create the "Basket Tree", Erlandson planted six sycamore trees in a circle, topped them all at one foot, then approach-grafted them together one to another to form the diamond patterns. For the first 8 feet (2.4 m) he left an opening at the top. This specimen today is featured as the centerpiece of Gilroy Gardens.

His roadside attraction The Tree Circus opened in the spring of 1947. On June 4, 1947, Erlandson wrote to Robert Ripley sending him 2 photos of his trees and inviting him to visit. Over the years, Erlandson's trees appeared twelve times in Robert's column, Ripley's Believe It or Not!. Income from visitor admissions was scant however, as the 1940 opening of Highway 17 had gradually routed tourist traffic away from the old stage route. In 1955, a relatively good year, the Tree Circus brought in $321.20. Life Magazine ran a pictorial in its January 14, 1957, issue, improving attendance.

The ecosystem ecologist, Nalini M. Nadkarni has written about the circus trees, and arborsculpture and many other tree arts in her book, Between Earth and Sky: Our Intimate Connections to Trees; she calls Erlandson the "grand old man of arborsculpture."

== "The Lost World" and beyond ==
In 1963, Erlandson sold the property for $12,000, to Larry and Peggy Thompson. They kept Erlandson as a hired caretaker. Erlandson died the following year in Capitola, California. Larry and Peggy Thompson had created and featured 25 to 30 enormous realistic life-sized models of many different species of dinosaurs, which attracted the attention of the passing traffic, installed a stream, and prepared to expand the attraction to several times its original size. They named the whole park "The Lost World." They renamed the grove of Axel Erlandson's Tree Circus to "The Enchanted Forest".

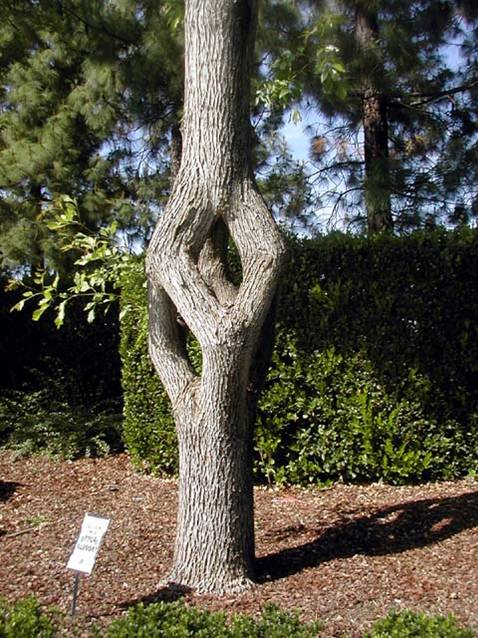
Cube Tree

Larry Thompson died before The Lost World could open. Peggy Thompson, left to raise three small children, managed to open the park successfully for a few years. She then tried to sell and the new owners defaulted. Subsequent lease owners went in and out of business.

In 1977 the property was purchased for commercial development by Robert Hogan and the trees were scheduled to be bulldozed. Mark Primack, a young architect, began documenting the trees and their story and received an art grant to draw and record them as they were. Joseph Cahill, a landscape designer, paid Hogan $12,000 for the trees and was given two and a half years to move them. Cahill cleaned up the site, and "Suddenly the good citizens of Santa Cruz and Scotts Valley were upset." A committee called the Friends of Scotts Valley Tree Circus was formed by Joe Cucchiara to keep the old trees put. At times Primack and his friends risked arrest for trespassing in order to water and feed the trees. Primack was quoted as saying "I know of no other single person who has taken ornamental grafting to such an extreme, it is not just an oddity. It demonstrates an intriguing option for improving our environment by creating an absolutely unique space of living sculpture." Efforts to have the trees declared historical or a cultural resource failed and Cahill's window for moving the trees closed. Hogan's plan for development did not materialize.

== Bonfante Gardens ==
In 1985, Michael Bonfante, owner of Nob Hill Foods, a grocery store chain, and Tree Haven, a tree nursery in Gilroy, California, bought the trees from Hogan and transplanted 24 of them to his new amusement park, Bonfante Gardens, now called Gilroy Gardens, in Gilroy. Two of Axel's most famous trees are The Basket Tree and the Needle and Thread Tree.

Preserved dead trees from Erlandson's collection reside today in the Museum of Art & History in Santa Cruz, California. One tree was loaned to the World Expo 2005, Aichi, Japan for display in the Growing Village pavilion. Erlandson's "Telephone Booth Tree" is on permanent display at the Baltimore, Maryland American Visionary Art Museum.

== See also ==
- Topiary – Horticultural practice to shape trees and shrubs
- Espalier – Pruning/tying branches to flat structure
- Arthur Wiechula – Tree shaping theorist
- Christopher Cattle – British furniture designer
- Richard Reames – American artist, arborsculptor, nurseryman, writer and public speaker
- Fab Tree Hab – Hypothetical Concept of ecological home design
- Full Grown – Company that grows trees into furniture and sculpture
- Tree shaping methods – Tree shaping methods and techniques
