= Tree shaping =

Use of living trees to create structures and art

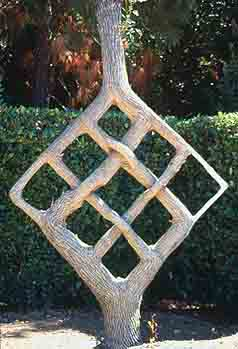
Needle & Thread Tree by Axel Erlandson

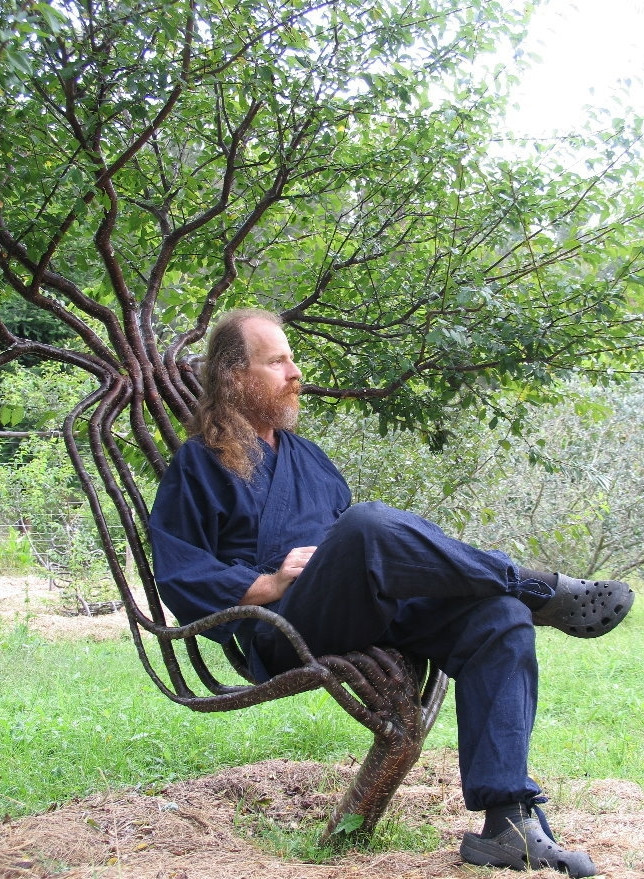
A chair formed by tree shaping

Tree shaping (also known by several other alternative names) uses living trees and other woody plants as the medium to create structures and art. There are a few different methods used by the various artists to shape their trees, which share a common heritage with other artistic horticultural and agricultural practices, such as pleaching, bonsai, espalier, and topiary, and employing some similar techniques. Most artists use grafting to deliberately induce the inosculation of living trunks, branches, and roots, into artistic designs or functional structures.

Tree shaping has been practiced for at least several hundred years, as demonstrated by the living root bridges built and maintained by the Khasi people of India. Early 20th-century practitioners and artisans included banker John Krubsack, Axel Erlandson with his Tree Circus, and landscape engineer Arthur Wiechula. Several contemporary designers also produce tree-shaping projects.

== History ==
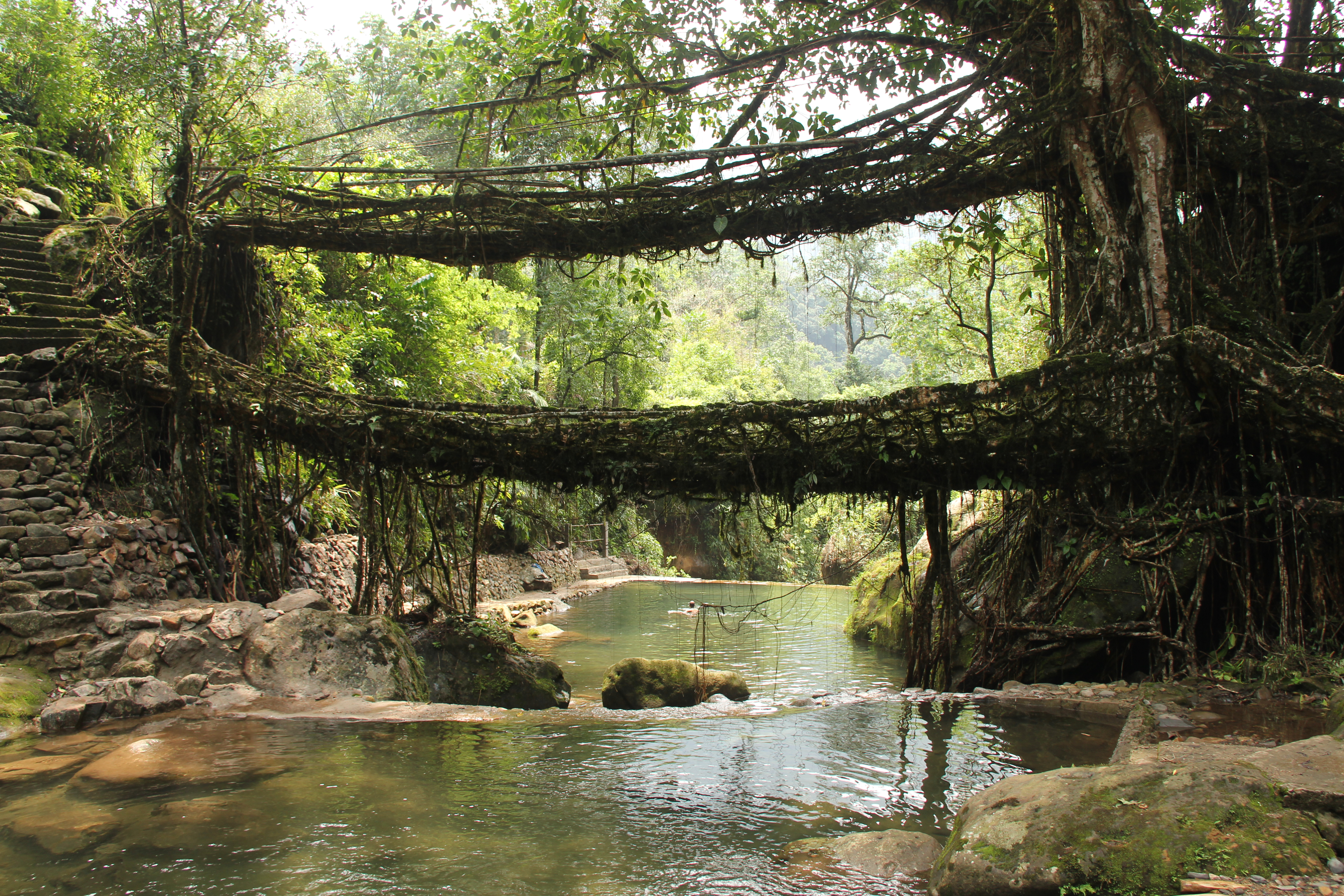
Living root bridges in Nongriat village, Meghalaya

Some species of trees exhibit a botanical phenomenon known as inosculation (or self-grafting); whether among parts of a single tree or between two or more individual specimens of the same (or very similar) species. Trees exhibiting this behavior are called inosculate trees.

The living root bridges of Cherrapunji, Laitkynsew, and Nongriat, in the present-day Meghalaya state of northeast India are examples of tree shaping. These suspension bridges are handmade from the aerial roots of living banyan fig trees, such as the rubber tree. The pliable tree roots are gradually shaped to grow across a gap, weaving in sticks, stones, and other inclusions, until they take root on the other side. This process can take up to fifteen years to complete. There are specimens spanning over 100 feet, some can hold up to the weight of 50 people. The useful lifespan of the bridges, once complete, is thought to be 500–600 years. They are naturally self-renewing and self-strengthening as the component roots grow thicker.

Living trees were used to create garden houses in the Middle East, a practice which later spread to Europe. In Cobham, Kent there are accounts of a three-story house that could hold 50 people.

Pleaching is a technique used in the very old horticultural practice of hedge laying. Pleaching consists of first plashing living branches and twigs and then weaving them together to promote their inosculation. It is most commonly used to train trees into raised hedges, though other shapes are easily developed. Useful implementations include fences, lattices, roofs, and walls. Some of the outcomes of pleaching can be considered an early form of what is known today as tree shaping. In an early, labor-intensive, practical use of pleaching in medieval Europe, trees were installed in the ground in parallel hedgerow lines or quincunx patterns, then shaped by trimming to form a flat-plane grid above ground level. When the trees' branches in this grid met those of neighboring trees, they were grafted together. Once the network of joints were of substantial size, builders laid planks across the grid, upon which they built huts to live in, thus keeping the human settlement safe in times of annual flooding. Wooden dancing platforms were also built and the living tree branch grid bore the weight of the platform and dancers.

== Methods ==
There are a few different methods of shaping trees. There is aeroponic culture, instant tree shaping and gradual tree shaping.

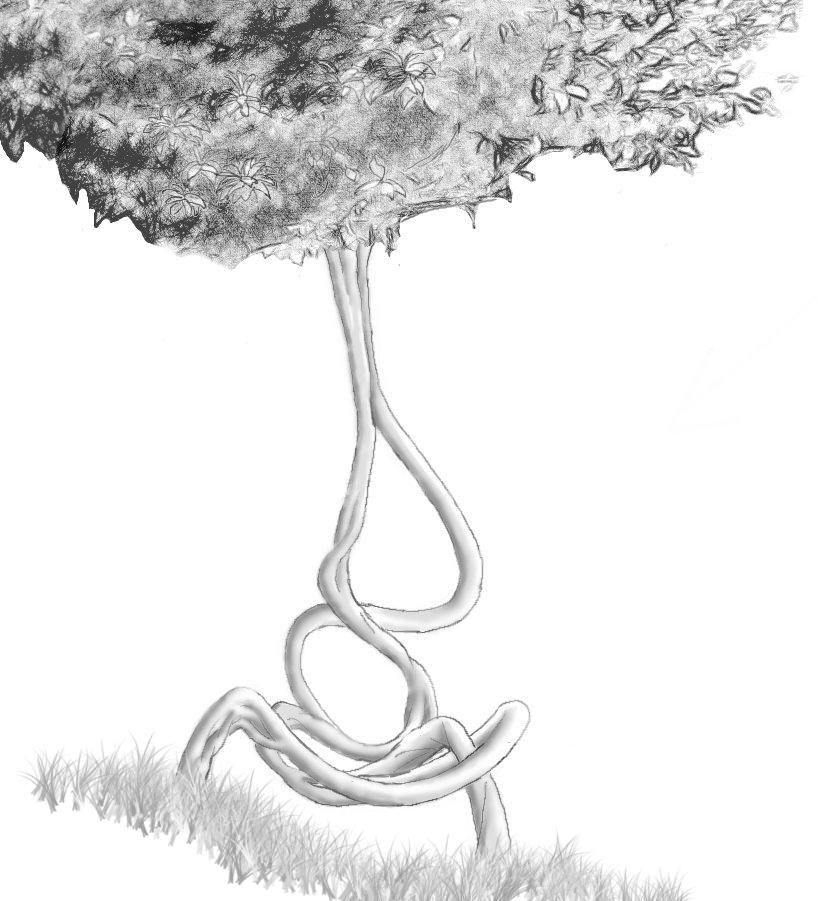
Chair created using aeroponic root shaping

Aeroponic culture uses aeroponics, a process of growing tree roots in a nutrient rich mist. Once the roots are of a desired length for the pre-determined design they are shaped as they are planted. This technique may be used in part to help form large permanent structures, such as eco-architecture. The oldest known root shaping are the living root bridges built by the ancient War-Khasi people of the Cherrapunjee region in India.

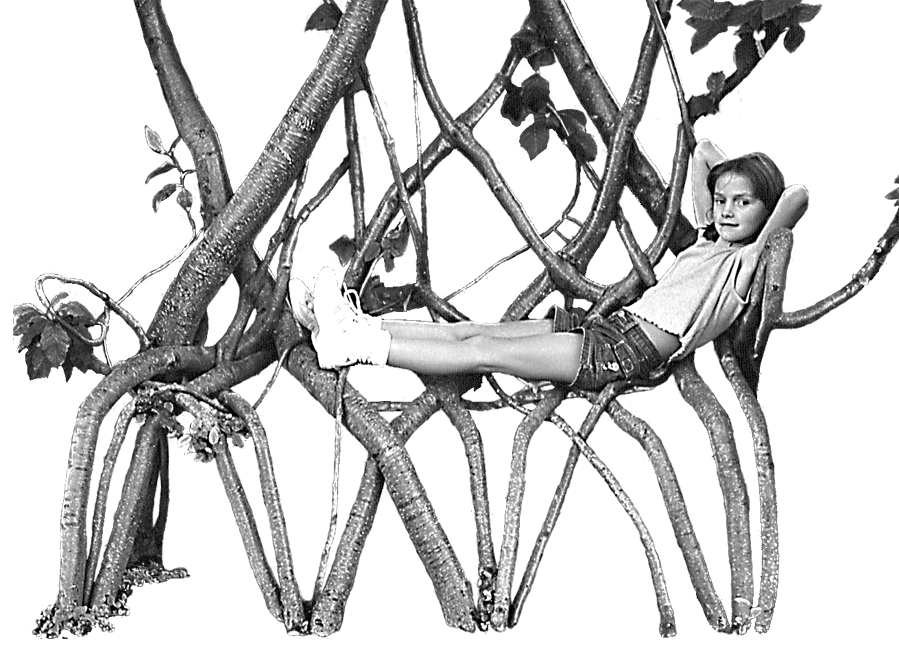
Living red alder bench by Richard Reames

Instant tree shaping is a method that uses flexible thin trees 2 to 4 m (6.6 to 13.1 ft). The trees are bent and woven into different designs and held until cast. Bends are then held in place for several years until their form is permanently cast. With this method it is possible to perform initial bending and grafting on a project in an hour, as with Peace in Cherry by Richard Reames. Girdling, also called ring-barking, may be employed to help balance a design should one part of the design outgrow the other, creating a loss of symmetry. Creasing is performed by folding trees such as willow and poplar over upon themselves without breaking.

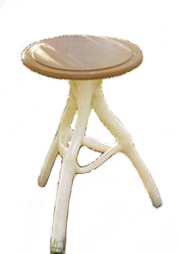
"Grownup furniture" three-legged stool by Chris Cattle

Gradual tree shaping starts with designing and framing. Young seedlings or saplings 3–12 in. (7.6–30.5 cm) long are planted. The growth is guided along predetermined design pathways; this may be a wooden jig or a complex wire design. The shaping zone is a small area just behind the growing tip that forms the final shape. This zone requires day to day or weekly guiding of the new growth. To achieve a finished piece takes longer with this method. A chair design might take 8 to 10 years to reach maturity. Some of Axel Erlandson's trees took 40 years to assume their finished shapes.

=== Common techniques ===
Some techniques are common to all the above methods though sometimes they are used differently for each.

Framing might consist of a combination or any one of several materials, including the tree itself, living or dead.

Grafting is a commonly employed technique that exploits the natural biological process of inosculation. A branch is cut and held in place, it can be of the same plant or another cultivar of the plant. Grafting is applied to create permanent connections and joints.

Pruning can be used to balance a design by controlling and directing growth into a desired shape.

Timing is used as part of the construction and is intrinsic to achieving this art form.

== Structure ==
Living grown structures have a number of structural mechanical advantages over those constructed of lumber and are more resistant to decay. While there are some decay organisms that can rot live wood from the outside, and though living trees can carry decayed and decaying heartwood inside them; in general, living trees decay from the inside out and dead wood decays from the outside in. Living wood tissue, particularly sapwood, wields a very potent defense against decay from either direction, known as compartmentalization. This protection applies to living trees only and varies among species.

Growing structures is not as easy as it would seem. Quick growing willows have been used to grow building structures, they provide support or protection. A young group of German architects are in the process of such a structure and they are continually monitored and checked. Once the trees are of age to be able to take on load-bearing weight they are tested for stability and strength by a structural engineer. Once this is approved the supporting framework is removed. Projects are limited to the trees' weight loading ability and growth. This is being studied and the load capacity will be proved by testing on prototypes.

== Design options ==
Designs may include abstract, symbolic, or functional elements. Some shapes crafted and grown are purely artistic; perhaps cubes, circles, or letters of an alphabet, while other designs might yield any of a wide variety of useful shapes, such as clothes hangers, laundry and wastepaper bins, ladders, furniture, tools, and tool handles. Eye-catching structures such as living fences and jungle gyms can also be grown, and even large architectural designs such as live archways, domes, gazebos, tunnels, and theoretically entire homes are possible with careful planning, planting, and culturing over time. The Human Ecology Design team (H.E.D.) at the Massachusetts Institute of Technology is designing homes that can be grown from native trees in a variety of climates.

Suitable trees are installed according to design specifications and then cultured over time into intended structures. Some designs may use only living, growing wood to form the structures, while others might also incorporate inclusions such as glass, mirror, steel and stone, any of which might be used either as either structural or aesthetic elements. Inclusions can be positioned in a project as it is grown and, depending on the design, may either be removed when no longer needed for support or left in place to become fixed inclusions in the growing tissue.

The benefit of using trees to grow a design which is then harvested for furniture is that these pieces are stronger than the results of conventional manufacturing process. This is because the grain of the timber flows through the design instead of being chopped into smaller pieces then glued back together. All the joins of a shaped tree are grafted, forming a stronger bond than a manufactured piece.

=== Environmental benefits ===
Shaped tree projects can play a role in mitigating the imbalance of carbon dioxide-oxygen that happens in cities, creating a microclimate that could be soothing to human habitation. The types of projects that could work in this environment would be playground equipment, road furniture, walkways with over-bridges and bus shelters. This increased growth of trees would improve the shade and create a fresh wind channel. When choosing the trees to use a fruit tree would have the added use of giving food as well. It can be renewable in the long run and when they die they can be used as fertilizer.

The trees and shaped roots can hold the soil preventing soil erosion and forestalling landslides. In the right circumstances the trees could be planted over landfills and garbage dumps. Biodegradable waste could be used to help the trees remain healthy.

== Chronology of notable practitioners ==
=== Tree fortifications ===
Julius Caesar describes in his De Bello Gallico that the Nervii planted and bent trees into wall-like hedges. Similar practices have been used throughout Europe until the 18th century, often as a comparatively cheap method to delineate regional borders with large-scale border fortifications. The resulting fortifications that developed around the original bent trees, usually left alone for centuries, could range up to 100 m in thickness. A similar example from Asia was the Willow Palisade that derived its name from the willows with wickered branches that made up part of the barrier.

=== War-Khasi people ===
The ancient War-Khasi people of India worked with the aerial roots of native banyan fig trees, adapting them to create footbridges over watercourses. Modern people of the Cherrapunjee region carry on this traditional building craft. Roots selected for bridge spans are supported and guided in darkness as they are being formed, by threading long, thin, supple banyan roots through tubes made from hollowed-out trunks of woody grasses. Preferred species for the tubes are either bamboo or areca palm, or 'kwai' in Khasi, which they cultivate for areca nuts. The Khasi incorporate aerial roots from overhanging trees to form support spans and safety handrails. Some bridges can carry fifty or more people at once. At least one example, over the Umshiang stream, is a double-decker bridge. They can take ten to fifteen years to become fully functional and are expected to last up to 600 years.

=== John Krubsack ===
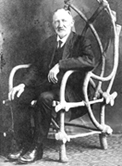
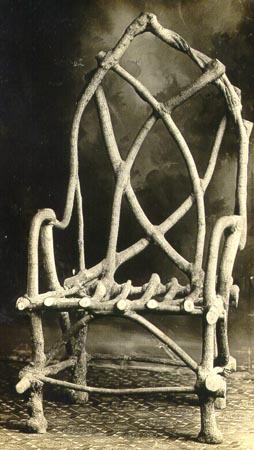

John Krubsack was an American banker and farmer from Embarrass, Wisconsin. He shaped and grafted the first known grown chair, harvesting it in 1914. He lived from 1858 to 1941. He had studied tree grafting and become a skilled found-wood furniture crafter. The idea first came to him to grow his own chair during a weekend wood-hunting excursion with his son.

He started box elder seeds in 1903, selecting and planting either 28 or 32 of the saplings in a carefully designed pattern in the spring of 1907. In the spring of 1908, the trees had grown to six feet tall and he began training them along a trellis, grafting the branches at critical points to form the parts of his chair. In 1913, he cut all the trees except those forming the legs, which he left to grow and increase in diameter for another year, before harvesting and drying the chair in 1914; eleven years after he started the box elder seeds. Dubbed The Chair that Lived; it is the only known tree shaping that John Krubsack did. The chair went on tour via several exhibitions around the US and was featured in Ripley's Believe It or Not!. The chair is on permanent display in a Plexiglas case at the entrance of Noritage Furniture; the furniture manufacturing business now owned by Krubsack's descendants, Steve and Dennis Krubsack.

=== Axel Erlandson ===
Basket Tree by Axel Erlandson

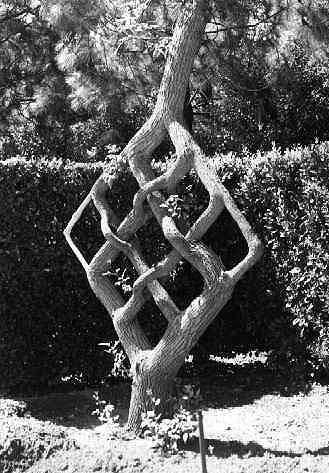
Needle & Thread Tree by Axel Erlandson

Axel Erlandson was a Swedish American farmer who started training trees as a hobby on his farm in Hilmar, California, in 1925. He was inspired by observing a natural sycamore inosculation in his hedgerow. In 1945, he moved his family and the best of his trees from Hilmar to Scotts Valley, California, and in 1947, opened an horticultural attraction called the Tree Circus.

Erlandson lived from 1884 to 1964; training more than 70 trees during his lifetime. He considered his methods trade secrets and when asked how he made his trees do this, he would only reply, "I talk to them." His work appeared in the column of Ripley's Believe It or Not! twelve times. 24 trees from his original garden have survived transplanting to their permanent home at Gilroy Gardens in Gilroy, California. His Telephone Booth Tree is on permanent display at the American Visionary Art Museum in Baltimore, Maryland and his Birch Loop tree is on permanent display at the Museum of Art and History in Santa Cruz, California. Both of these are preserved dead specimens.

=== Arthur Wiechula ===
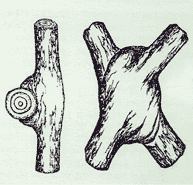
19th-century sketch by Arthur Wiechula of inosculated branches

Arthur Wiechula was a German landscape engineer who lived from 1868 to 1941. In 1926, he published Wachsende Häuser aus lebenden Bäumen entstehend (Developing Houses from Living Trees) in German. In it, he gave detailed illustrated descriptions of houses grown from trees and described simple building techniques involving guided grafting together of live branches; including a system of v-shaped lateral cuts used to bend and curve individual trunks and branches in the direction of a design, with reaction wood soon closing the wounds to hold the curves. He proposed growing wood so that it constituted walls during growth, thereby enabling the use of young wood for building. Weichula never built a living home, but he grew a 394' wall of Canadian poplars to help keep the snow off of a section of train tracks.

=== Dan Ladd ===
Dan Ladd is a Northampton, Massachusetts based American artist who works with trees and gourds. He began experimenting with glass, china, and metal inclusions in trees in 1977 in Vermont and started planting trees for Extreme Nature in 1978. He became inspired by inosculation he noticed in nature and by the growth of tree trunks around man-made objects such as fences and idle farm equipment. He shapes and grafts trees, including their fruits and their roots, into architectural and geometric forms. Ladd calls human-initiated inosculation 'pleaching' and calls his own work 'tree sculpture'. Ladd binds a variety of objects to trees, for live wood to grow around and be incorporated, including teacups, bicycle wheels, headstones, steel spheres, water piping, and electrical conduit. He guides roots into shapes, such as stairs, using above-ground wooden and concrete forms and even shapes woody, hard-shelled Lagenaria gourds by allowing them to grow into detailed molds. A current project at the DeCordova and Dana Museum and Sculpture Park in Lincoln, Massachusetts incorporates eleven American Liberty Elm trees grafted next to each other to form a long hillside stair banister. Another of his installations, Three Arches, consists of three pairs of 14-foot sycamore trees, which he grafted into arches to frame different city views, at Frank Curto Park in Pittsburgh.

=== Nirandr Boonnetr ===
Nirandr Boonnetr is a Thai furniture designer and crafter. He became inspired as a child, both by a photograph of some unusually twisted coconut palms in southern Thailand and by a living fallen tree he noticed, which had grown new branches along its trunk, forming a kind of canopied bridge. His hobby began in 1980 because of his concern the Thailand forests are being ravaged by woodcarvers to the point that one day the industry would eventually carve itself out of existence. He began his first piece, a guava chair, c. 1983. Originally intended as something for his children to climb and play on, the piece evolved into a living tree chair. In fifteen years he created six pieces of "living furniture", including five chairs and a table. The Bangkok Post dubbed him the father of Living Furniture. Shortly thereafter, he presented a chair as a gift to her Royal Highness, Princess Sirindhorn. Nirandr Boonnetr has written a detailed, step-by-step booklet of instructions hoping his hobby of living furniture will spread to other countries. One of his chairs was exhibited in the Growing Village pavilion at the World's Fair Expo 2005 in Nagakute, Aichi, Japan.

=== Peter Cook and Becky Northey ===
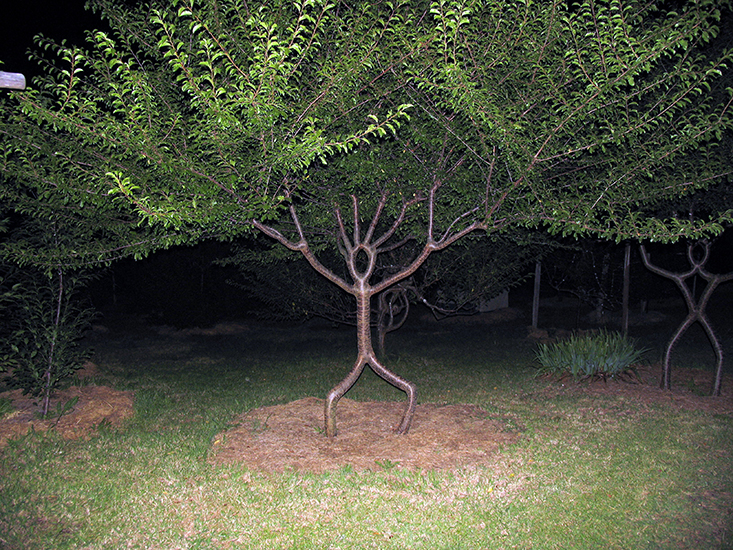
People trees, by Pooktre

Peter Cook and Becky Northey of Pooktre are Australian artists who live in South East Queensland. Cook began to grow his first chair in 1987 with 7 willow cuttings. He was inspired by three fig trees on his property. They were the featured artists at the Growing Village pavilion showing 8 pieces of grown art at the World's Expo 2005 in Nagakute, Aichi Prefecture, Japan.

Their methods involve guiding the tree's growth along predetermined wire design pathways over a period of time. They shape growing trees both for living outdoor art and for intentional harvest. They most often use Myrobalan Plum for shaping.

=== Richard Reames ===
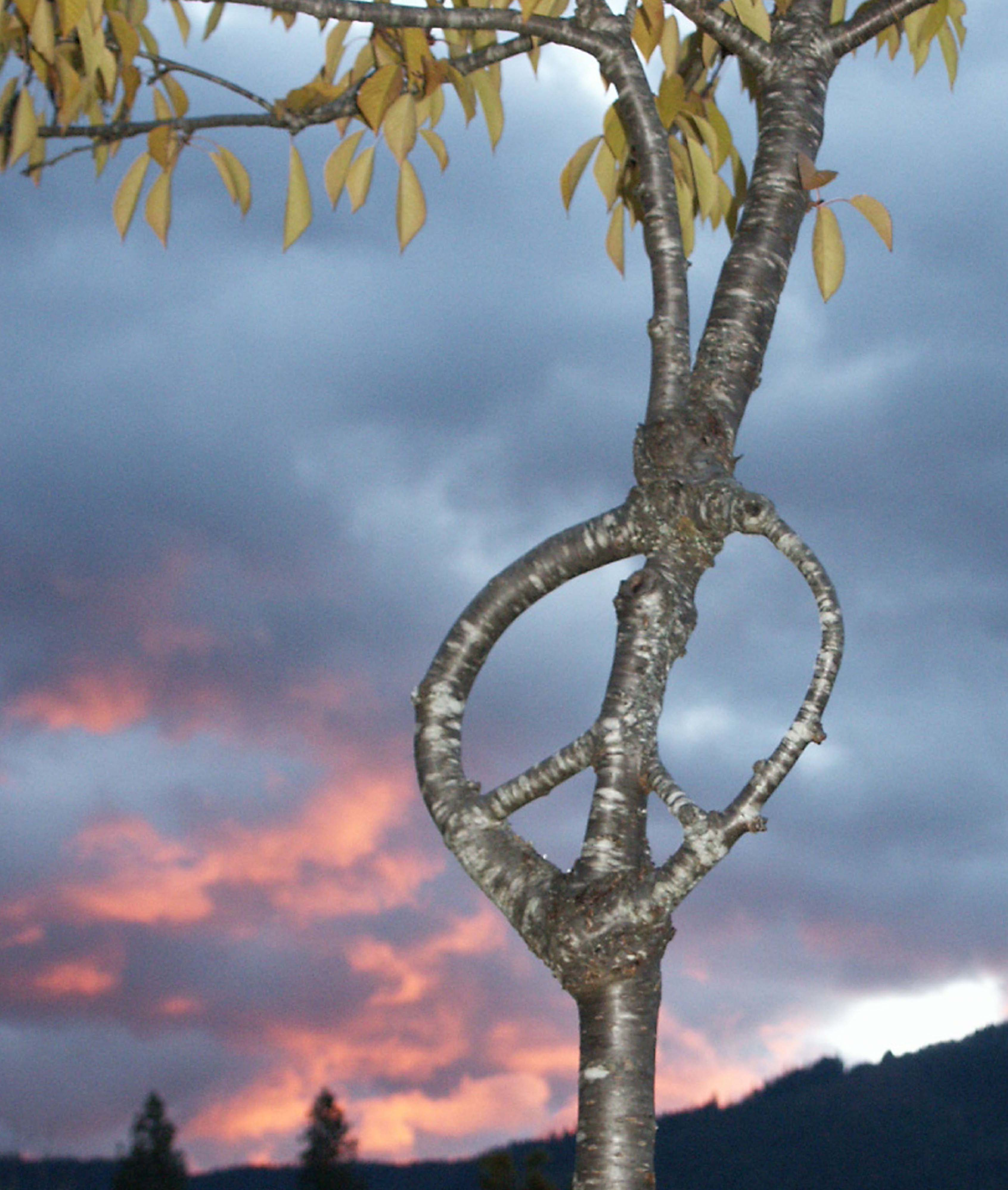
Richard Reames's Peace in Cherry

Richard Reames is an American nurseryman and author based in Williams, Oregon, where he owns and manages a nursery, and design studio collectively named Arborsmith Studios. He was inspired by the works of Axel Erlandson, and began sculpting trees in 1991 or 1992. He began his first experimental grown chairs in the spring of 1993.

In 1995, Reames wrote and published his first book, How to Grow a Chair: The Art of Tree Trunk Topiary. In it, he coined the word arborsculpture. His second book, Arborsculpture: Solutions for a Small Planet was published in 2005.

=== Christopher Cattle ===
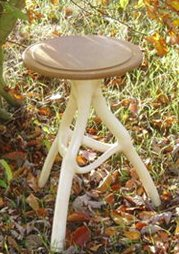
Christopher Cattle's grown stool in sycamore

Christopher Cattle is a retired furniture design professor from Oxford England. He started his first planting of furniture in 1996. According to Cattle, in the late 1970s he developed an idea to train and graft trees to grow into shapes in response to questions from students asking how to build furniture using less energy. Using various species of trees and wooden jigs to shape them, he has grown 15 three-legged stools to completion.

He hopes to inspire others to grow their own furniture, and envisions that, "One day, furniture factories could be replaced by furniture orchards." He calls his works "grown up furniture", "grown stools", and "grown furniture", calling them "the result of mature thinking."

=== Mr. Wu ===
Mr. Wu is a Chinese pensioner who designs, crafts and grows furniture in Shenyang, Liaoning, China. He has been practicing this from 2000. He enjoys some worldwide fame. He has patented his technique of growing wooden chairs and as of 2005, had designed, grown, and harvested one chair, in 2004. He had six more growing in his garden. Wu uses young elm trees, which he says are pliant and do not break easily. He also says that it takes him about five years to grow a tree chair. He now uses his finished chairs within his home, with the hope of inspiring others to grow furniture.

=== Gavin Munro ===
Gavin Munro is a designer who grows chairs, lamps, mirror frames and tables by training trees in his chair orchard located at Wirksworth, in Derbyshire, England. Munro co-founded Full Grown in 2005.

== Related practices ==
Other artistic horticultural practices such as bonsai, espalier, and topiary share some elements and a common heritage, though a number of distinctions may be identified.

=== Bonsai ===
Bonsai is the art of growing trees in small containers. Bonsai uses techniques such as pruning, root reduction, and shaping branches and roots to produce small trees that mimic full-sized mature trees. Bonsai is not intended for production of food, but instead mainly for contemplation by viewers, like most fine art.

=== Espalier ===
Espalier is the art and horticultural practice of training tree branches onto ornamental shapes along a frame for aesthetic and fruit production by grafting, shaping and pruning the branches so that they grow flat, frequently in formal patterns, against a structure such as a wall, fence, or trellis. The practice is commonly used to accelerate and increase production in fruit-bearing trees and also to decorate flat exterior walls while conserving space.

=== Pleaching ===
Pleaching is a technique of weaving the branches of trees into a hedge. Commonly, deciduous trees are planted in lines, then pleached to form a flat plane on clear stems above the ground level. Branches are woven together and lightly tied. Branches in close contact may grow together, due to a natural phenomenon called inosculation, a natural graft. Pleach also means weaving of thin, whippy stems of trees to form a basketry affect.

=== Topiary ===
Topiary is the horticultural practice of shaping live trees, by clipping the foliage and twigs of trees and shrubs to develop and maintain clearly defined shapes, often geometric or fanciful. The hedge is a simple form of topiary used to create boundaries, walls or screens. Topiary always involves regular shearing and shaping of foliage to maintain the shape.

== Plantings for the future ==
=== The Fab Tree Hab ===
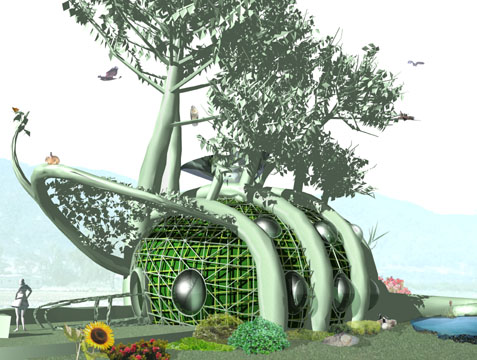
Fab Tree Hab 3D render

Three MIT designers – Mitchell Joachim, Lara Greden and Javier Arbona – created a concept of a living tree house which nourishes its inhabitants and merges with its environment. The project of Fab Tree Hab is expected to take a minimum of five years to grow the home. The plans are for the interior to be lined with clay and plastered to keep the weather outside and to look normal. The exterior is to be all natural.

=== The Patient Gardener ===
A Swedish architectural firm VisionDivision took part in a week-long workshop at the Italian university Politecnico di Milano with the students. The result was an 80-year plan of a living cherry tree dome in an hourglass shape and grown furniture. On 8 November 2011, ten Japanese cherry trees were planted with the framing of the dome. The Japanese cherry trees were planted in a diameter of eight-meter circle. Four of these trees are to be living staircases to a future top level. The stair trees will have their branches grafted into each other to form the rungs. VisionDivision's architects helped the students and instructors to create an easy maintenance plan for future gardeners of the university.

=== Baubotanik Tower ===
The Baubotanik Tower was designed by Ferdinand Ludwig as part of his doctoral thesis with the help of Prof. Dr. Speck. Growing at the University of Stuttgart is a three-storey tower of living white willows (Salix alba). This nine-meter-tall construction is fully grown as of 27 April 2024, with a base area of around eight square meters.

The framing is made up of mainly steel scaffolding which is supporting the growing trees, while keeping them to the correct form. They started with 400 white willow (Salix alba) grown in baskets on multiple levels with one row of willows planted into the ground. Once the trees were two meters tall, they were planted at the different levels of the tower. These plants are then trained to the design.

The root system of the bottom level of willows needs to develop large enough to support the willows on the above levels, so that the scaffold becomes obsolete and then it and the watering and fertilising baskets can be removed altogether.

The trees are grafted together with the objective of all the different plants eventually becoming a single organism. The overall aim is to have a living structure with the strength to support itself and to carry a working load. Ferdinand predicts the tower will be stable enough to support itself in five to ten years. Ferdinand does state "However, these are only estimates."

== Assessment ==
The advantages are trees can improve the habitation by generating more oxygen, giving shade and reuse of waste water creating a micro climate. Living trees are less prone to rot than timber via a process called compartmentalization. The joins are stronger than man made joinery. They are also resistant to earthquakes and tsunamis.

Some issues are the lack of working knowledge of how trees grow by architects and others. The speed of growth is unpredictable and they can grow in unwanted ways – thus creating a need to make plans adjustable. Trees can only reach a specific height and size dictated by their species. The environment can have a large impact on the growth and health of the trees.

== Alternative names ==
The practice of shaping living trees has several names. Practitioners may have their own name for their techniques, so a standard name for the various practices has not emerged. "Arborsculpture", "tree sculpture", "living furniture", and other names have been used.

The following names are also encountered:

- Arbortecture
- Biotecture/Biotechture
- Grown furniture
- Living Art
- Pleaching
- Tree training
- Baubotanik

== In fiction and art ==
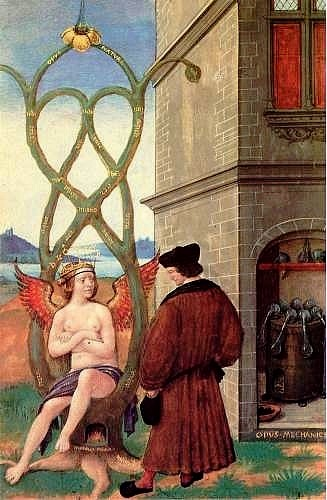
1516 painting by Jean Perréal

In 1516, Jean Perréal painted an allegorical image, La complainte de nature à l'alchimiste errant, (The Lament of Nature to the Wandering Alchemist), in which a winged figure with arms crossed, representing nature, sits on a tree stump with a fire burning in its base, conversing with an alchemist in an ankle-length coat, standing outside of his stone-laid shoreline laboratory. Live resprouting shoots emerge from either side of the tree stump seat to form a fancifully twined and inosculated two-story-tall chair back.

In 1758, Swedish scientist, philosopher, Christian mystic, and theologian Emanuel Swedenborg published Earths in the Universe, in which he wrote of visiting another planet where the residents dwelled in living groves of trees, whose growth they had planned and directed from a very young stage into living quarters and sanctuaries.

In the late 19th century, Styrian Christian mystic and visionary Jakob Lorber published The Household of God. In it, he wrote about the wisdom of planting trees in a circle, because once grown together, the ring of trees would be a much better house than could be built.

There are also tree-shaping elves in the 1978 comic book series Elfquest. They created homes, bows, animal forms, and other things to grow instantly from living trees. Most notable of these elves are Redlance and Goodtree.

== See also ==
- Land art
- Landscaping
