= Pleaching =

Interwoven branches to form a hedge, fence or lattice

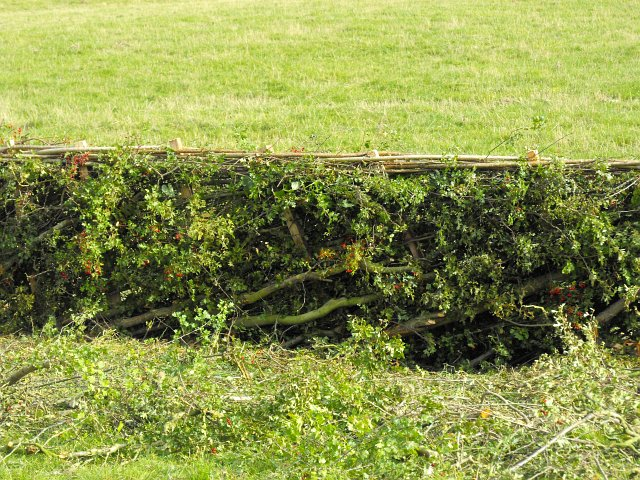
A hedge laid using pleaching

Pleaching or plashing is a technique of interweaving living and dead branches through a hedge creating a fence, hedge, or lattices. Trees are planted in lines and the branches are woven together to strengthen and fill any weak spots until the hedge thickens. Branches in close contact may grow together, due to a natural phenomenon called inosculation, a natural graft. Pleach also means weaving thin, whippy stems of trees forming a basketry effect.

== History ==
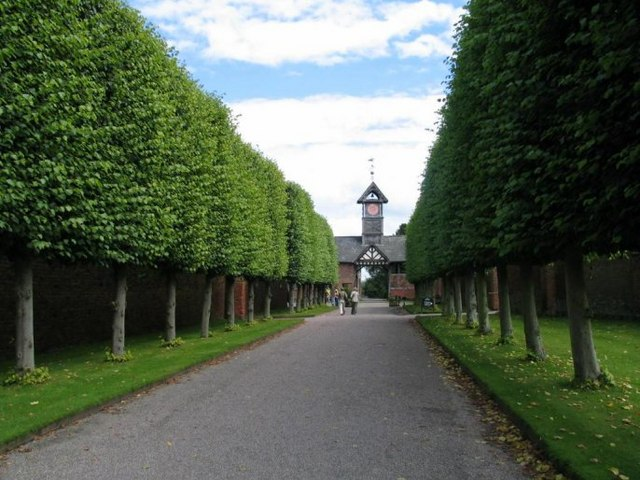
An allée of pleached lime trees at Arley Hall in Cheshire, England

Pleaching or plashing (an early synonym) was common in gardens from late medieval times to the early eighteenth century, to create shaded paths, or to create a living fence out of trees or shrubs. Commonly deciduous trees were used by planting them in lines. The canopy was pruned into flat planes with the lower branches removed leaving the stems below clear. The craft had been developed by European farmers who used it to make their hedge rows more secure. Julius Caesar (circa 60 B.C.) says that the Gallic tribe of Nervii used plashing to create defensive barriers against cavalry.

In hedgelaying, the technique can be used to improve or renew a quickset hedge to form a thick, impenetrable barrier suitable for enclosing animals. It keeps the lower parts of a hedge thick and dense, and was traditionally done every few years. The stems of hedging plants are slashed through to the centre or more, then bent over and interwoven. The plants rapidly regrow, forming a dense barrier along its entire length. In garden design, the same technique has produced elaborate structures, neatly shaded walks, and allées. It was not much seen in the American colonies, where a labor-intensive aesthetic has not been a feature of gardening: "Because of the time needed in caring for pleached allées," Donald Wyman said, "they are but infrequently seen in American gardens, but are frequently observed in Europe."

After the second quarter of the eighteenth century, the technique withdrew to the kitchen garden, and the word dropped out of English usage, until Sir Walter Scott reintroduced it for local color, in The Fortunes of Nigel (1822). After the middle of the nineteenth century, English landowners were once again planting avenues, often shading the sweeping curves of a drive, but sometimes straight allées of pleached limes, as Rowland Egerton's at Arley Hall in Cheshire, England, which survive in splendidly controlled form.

In Much Ado About Nothing, Antonio reports (I.ii.8ff) that the Prince and Count Claudio were "walking in a thick pleached alley in my orchard." A modern version of such free-standing pleached fruit trees is sometimes called a "Belgian fence": young fruit trees pruned to four or six wide Y-shaped crotches, in the candelabra-form espalier called a palmette verrier, are planted at close intervals, about two meters apart, and their branches are bound together to makes a diagonal lattice, a regimen of severe seasonal pruning; lashing young growth to straight sticks and binding the joints repeat the pattern. Smooth-barked trees including limewood or linden trees, or hornbeams were most often used in pleaching. A sunken parterre surrounded on three sides by pleached allées of laburnum is a feature of the Queen's Garden, Kew, laid out in 1969 to complement the seventeenth-century Anglo-Dutch architecture of Kew Palace. A pleached hornbeam hedge about three meters high is a feature of the replanted town garden at Rubens House in Antwerp, Belgium, recreated from Rubens' painting The Walk in the Garden and from seventeenth-century engravings.

In the gardens of André Le Nôtre and his followers, pleaching kept the vistas of straight rides through woodland cleanly bordered. At Studley Royal in Yorkshire, the avenues began to be pleached once again, as an experiment in restoration, in 1972.

== Pleaching in art ==
The word pleach has been used to describe the art form of tree shaping or one of the techniques of tree shaping. Pleaching describes the weaving of branches into houses, furniture, ladders, and many other 3D art forms. Examples of living pleached structures include Richard Reames's red alder bench and Axel Erlandson's sycamore tower. There are also conceptual ideas like the Fab Tree Hab.

== See also ==
- Espalier
- Quincunx, "a pattern used for planting trees"
- Topiary
- Tree shaping
