= Gilroy Gardens =

Family amusement and nature park

Gilroy Gardens Family Theme Park
- Previously known as Bonfante Gardens (2001–2006)
- Interactive map of Gilroy Gardens Family Theme Park
- Location: 3050 Hecker Pass Hwy. Gilroy, California, United States
- Coordinates: 37°0′19″N 121°37′41″W
- Status: Operating
- Opened: June 15, 2001
- Owner: City of Gilroy, California
- Operated by: Gilroy Gardens, Inc. a 501(c)(3) organization
- Theme: Horticulture
- Operating season: Late March – early January
- Area: 536 acres (217 ha)

Attractions
- Roller coasters: 2
- Website: Official website

Gilroy Gardens Family Theme Park, often shortened to Gilroy Gardens, is a horticulture-themed amusement park located in Gilroy, California, United States. Designed and built by Michael Bonfante, the park originally opened as Bonfante Gardens in 2001. The 536-acre theme park (217 ha) is owned by the city of Gilroy and operated by Gilroy Gardens, Inc. a 501(c)(3) nonprofit organization; it features over 40 rides and attractions and is known for its Circus Trees, created by Axel Erlandson.

== History ==
The park was founded by Michael and Claudia Bonfante after selling their Nob Hill Foods supermarket chain to Raley's in order to focus on building their tree park. The park was constructed gradually over a period of 25 years. Before it became an amusement park open to the public, it was known as Tree Haven, and was a commercial plant nursery, as well as a recreational facility for employees of Nob Hill Foods. The park opened to the public in June 2001 as Bonfante Gardens. The name was changed to Gilroy Gardens in February 2007. The park features 19 rides, 27 attractions and six gardens. The most well known garden features 24 Circus Trees that were grown and shaped with multiple trunks, basket-weave patterns, and hearts by the late Axel Erlandson.

Starting in 2004, the park began its annual holiday celebration, Gilroy Gardens Holiday Lights.

The park struggled with financial difficulty and low attendance during the first two years of operation. It closed early for its first two seasons and the park's management debated whether to open the park at all for the third season. Paramount Parks began to manage the park on contract starting with the 2003 season.

Cedar Fair (now Six Flags) acquired Paramount Parks from CBS Corporation in June 2006 and continued the management contract to operate Gilroy Gardens. On December 31, 2021, the contract to manage the park expired after both parties decided not to renew the contract. Gilroy Gardens Inc., the nonprofit that owns the park, began operating the park on its own for the 2022 season.

The city of Gilroy purchased the park on March 5, 2008.

In mid-March 2020 the park shut down due to the COVID-19 pandemic. It reopened in May 2021, and since then it has been restricted to California residents and adhering to strict measures like social distancing and wearing masks.

On July 25-27, 2025, the site hosted the annual Gilroy Garlic Festival.

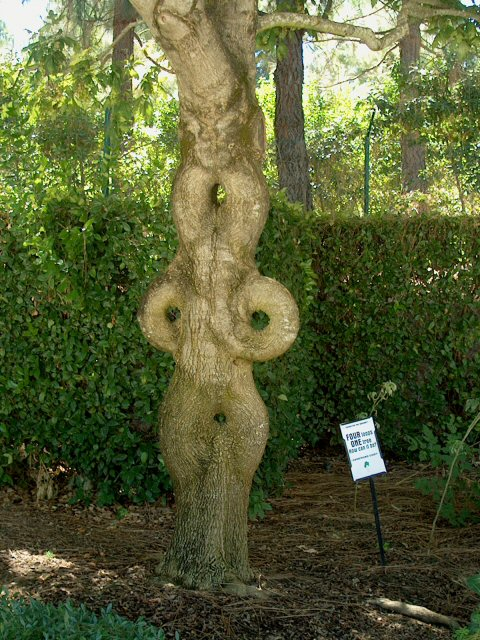
One of the famous Circus Trees at Gilroy Gardens

== Attractions ==
=== Roller coasters ===
| Name | Opened | Manufacturer | Model | Description | Thrill Level |
|---|---|---|---|---|---|
| Quicksilver Express Mine Coaster | 2001 | Morgan | | A mine-themed roller coaster. | 4 |
| Timber Twister Coaster | 2001 | Zierer | Medium Tivoli | A rattlesnake themed roller coaster. | 3 |

=== Family rides ===
| Name | Opened | Manufacturer | Model | Description | Thrill Level |
|---|---|---|---|---|---|
| Apple & Worm | Unknown | Zierer | Unknown | Children's caterpillar ride around a giant apple core. | 1 |
| Artichoke Dip | 2001 | Morgan | Junior Seastorm | Artichoke ride around a coastal live oak tree. | 1 |
| Banana Split | 2001 | Chance Rides | Pirate Ship | Banana-shaped swinging ship ride. | 3 |
| Balloon Flight | 2001 | Bradley and Kaye | Balloon Flight | Balloon ride. | 2 |
| Big Red Engine Co. | 2001 | Venture Manufacturing | Unknown | Children's firetruck ride. | 1 |
| Bonfante Railroad Train Ride | 2001 | Chance Rides | Train ride | 2 ft (610 mm) narrow gauge train ride around park perimeter. | 2 |
| Bulgy The Goldfish | 2001 | Unknown | Unknown | Children's fish ride. | 1 |
| Claudia's Carousel | | | Carousel | Children's carousel. | 1 |
| Illions Supreme Carousel | 2001 | Brass Ring Carousel Company | Carousel | Modern fiberglass carousel inspired by the original built in 1927 by M.C. Illions | 1 |
| Paddle Boats | 2001 | Bonfante family | Paddle Boats | Duck shaped paddle boats. | 2 |
| Panoramic Wheel | 2001 | Zierer | Ferris Wheel | Mini Ferris wheel. | 2 |
| Pit Stop Racers | 2001 | Ramagosa | Unknown | Children's race car ride. | 1 |
| Rainbow Garden Round Boat Ride | 2001 | Hopkins Rides | Raft ride | Raft ride though flower gardens. | 2 |
| Sky Trail Monorail | 2002 | Morgan | Monorail | Monorail ride through Monarch Butterfly Greenhouse. Audio tape still refers to the park as "Bonfante Gardens" | 2 |
| South County Backroads | 2002 | Morgan | Track ride | Car attraction featuring two tracks: one side themed to the 1920s cars, and the other themed to 1950s cars. | 2 |
| Strawberry Sundae | 2001 | Morgan | Junior Chair-O-Plane | Spinning strawberry ride. | 1 |
| Tubs-O-Fun | 2001 | Chance Rides | Teacup ride | Children's "tea cups" ride. | 1 |

=== Thrill rides ===
| Name | Opened | Manufacturer | Model | Description | Thrill Level |
|---|---|---|---|---|---|
| Garlic Twirl | 2001 | Morgan | Teacups | Garlic-themed "teacups" style ride. | 3 |
| Mushroom Swing | 2001 | Zierer | Wave Swinger | Mushroom shaped swing ride. | 3 |

Other attractions:

- Bonfante Falls (formerly Pinnacles Waterfall)‍—‌Bridge behind an artificial waterfall.
- Oak Park Playground‍—‌Children's play area.
- Lakeside Splash - Water playground and slides for children (introduced in 2024 replacing Bonfante's Splash Garden)
- Water Oasis‍—‌Water play area aimed at smaller children (introduced in 2014 replacing Pinnacles Rock Maze.)

Former attractions:

- Pinnacles Rock Maze‍—‌Artificial maze resembling caves found at Pinnacles National Park.
- Bonfante's Splash Garden‍—‌Water play area, opened in June 2005, closed 2022.

== Mascots ==
Gilroy Gardens has two mascots, Gil and Roy. Gil was introduced in 2007 and Roy in 2013.

The park also uses seasonal mascots for its Great Big Boo and North Pole Nights events.

== See also ==
- Tree Shaping: Creating with living trees structures and art
