= Fab Tree Hab =

Hypothetical Concept of ecological home design

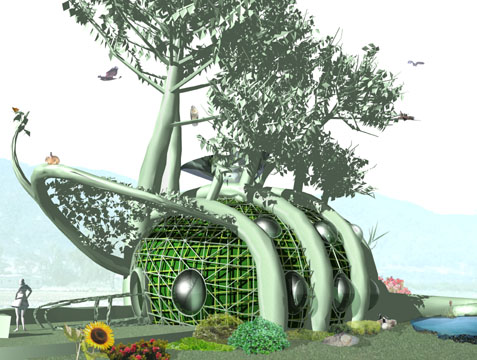
Fab Tree Hab, a "Local Biota Living Graft Structure"

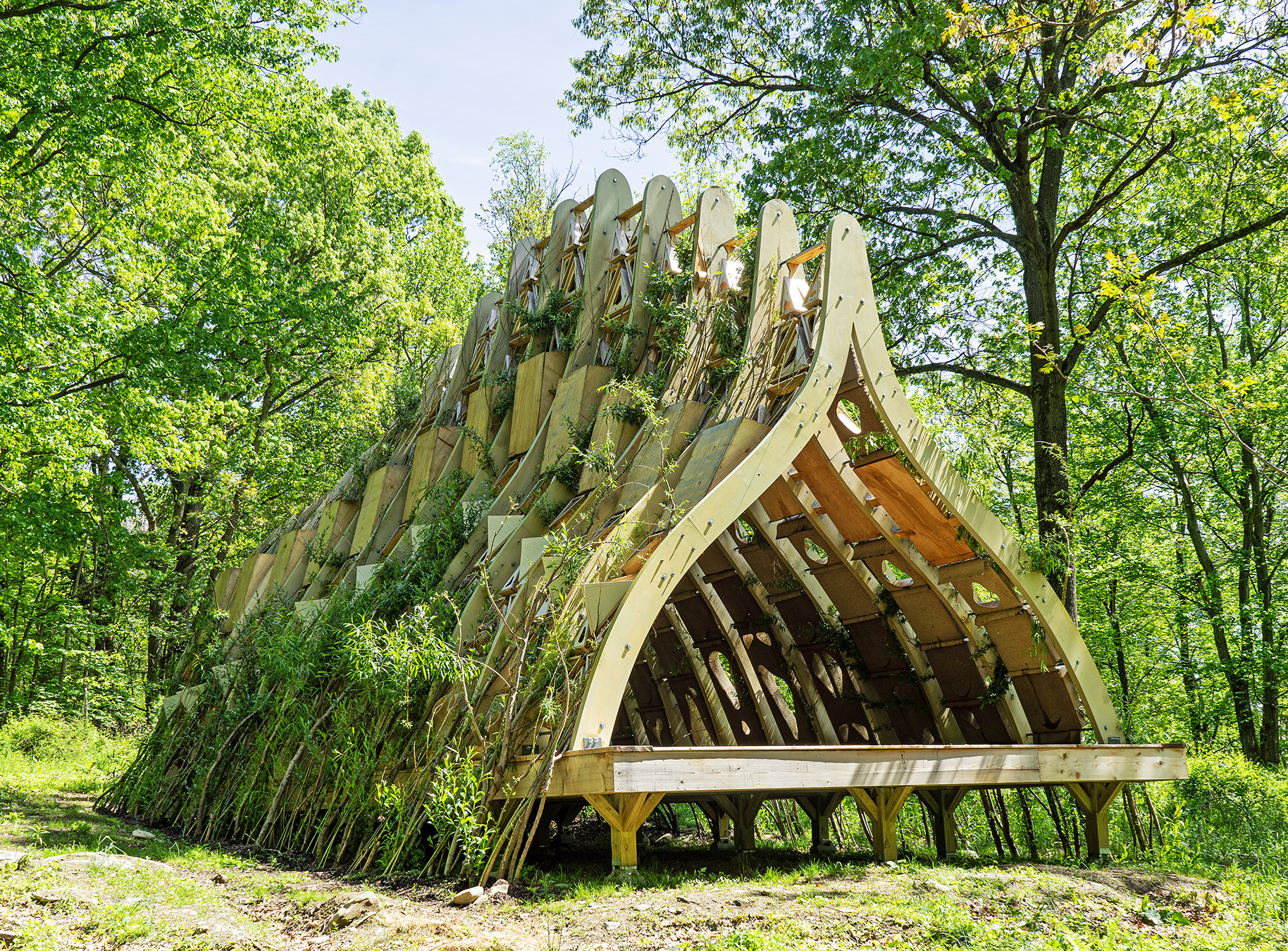
Fab Tree Hab architectural structure shaped from grafted willow trees.

The Fab Tree Hab is a hypothetical ecological home design developed at MIT in the early 2000s by Mitchell Joachim, Javier Arbona and Lara Greden. With the idea of easing the burden humanity places on the environment with conventional housing by growing "living, breathing" tree homes.

It would be built by allowing native trees to grow over a removable plywood scaffold cut into complex shapes using CNC machining. Once the plants are interconnected and stable, the plywood would be removed and reused. MIT is experimenting with trees that grow quickly and develop an interwoven root structure that's soft enough to "train" over the scaffold, but then hardens into a more durable structure. The inside walls would be conventional clay and plaster.

An old methodology new to buildings is introduced in this design: pleaching. Pleaching is a method of weaving together tree branches to form living archways, lattices, or screens. The technique is also named "aeroponic culture". The load-bearing part of the structure uses trees that self-graft or inosculate such as live oak, elm and dogwood. The lattice frame for the walls and roof are created with the branches of the trees. Vines create a dense protective layer woven along the exterior, interspersed with soil pockets and growing plants.

This building could be sustainable as it uses bio-waste for manure for the trees. Which can use the grey water from the home for the trees and garden. There are plans to be able to use rainwater. These buildings would improve the quality of life by giving back to nature instead of just using it's resources. Throughout the whole life cycle of the home it remains part of the ecology, feeding different organisms at different times of its life. The expected life span is greater than standard structures of brick and concrete. The whole community and the individual would benefit from this life style.

The Fab Tree Hab is an experiment that would develop over time. Extra operating costs required over the life-time of the home include pest management with organic pesticides and maintenance of the living machine's water treatment system. Technical demonstration and innovation is still needed for certain components, primarily the bioplastic windows that accept growth of the structure and the management of flows across the wall section to assure that the interior remains dry and animal-free. All in all, the elapsed time to reach livability is greater than the traditional sense, but so should be the health and longevity of the home and family. Above all, building this home could be achieved at a minimal price. Depending on the surrounding climate the house is to be grown in, the team expect it will take a minimum of five years to complete its structure. Realization of these homes will begin as an experiment, and it is envisioned that thereafter, the concept of renewal will take on a new architectural form, one of inter-dependency between nature and people.

As of May 2007 Mitchell Joachim stated that there is a "50 per cent" organic project in California, combining natural elements and traditional construction.

== Trees ==
Main trees suggested to be used are elms, dogwood and oaks. The teams hopes the homes can be grown using mainly native trees.

== See also ==
- Autonomous building – Building designed to be independent from public infrastructure
- Biophilic design – Nature-inspired design
- Bosco Verticale – Skyscraper complex in Milan, Italy
- Deep energy retrofit – Energy saving project for existing buildings
- Earth structure – Building or other structure made largely from soil
- Ecohouse – Home built to have low environmental impact
- Ecological design – Design approach sensitive to environmental impacts
- Energy-plus building – Edifices with surplus electricity
- Green architecture – Architecture designed to minimize environmental impact
- Green building – Environmentally responsible construction principles
- Green home – Type of house designed to be environmentally sustainable
- Low-energy house – House designed for reduced energy use
- Natural building – Sustainable construction practice
- Passive solar building design – Architectural engineering that uses the Sun's heat without electric or mechanical systems
- Regenerative medicine – Medical field involved in regenerating tissues
- Sustainable architecture – Architecture designed to minimize environmental impact
- Sustainable design – Environmentally conscious design
- Terreform ONE – US-based non-profit organization
- Tissue engineering – Biomedical engineering discipline
- Tree shaping – Use of living trees to create structures and art
- Urban ecology – Scientific study of living organisms
- Zero-energy building – Energy efficiency standard for buildings
- Zero heating building – Building without heating demand
