= Tomato grafting =

Horticulture technique

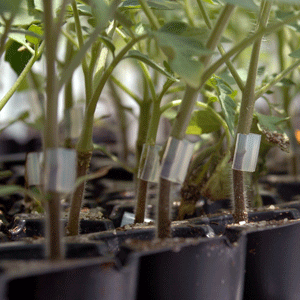
Grafted tomato plants

Tomato grafting is a horticulture technique that has been utilized in Asia and Europe for greenhouse and high tunnel production and is gaining popularity in the United States. Typically, stock or rootstock are selected for their ability to resist infection by certain soilborne pathogens or their ability to increase vigor and fruit yield. The scion of the grafted tomato represents the upper portion of the plant and is selected for its fruit quality characteristics. There are several methods for grafting tomatoes and they have certain advantages and disadvantages. Once the grafts are made, the plants are moved into a chamber or environment with high relative humidity (>90%) and low light levels to reduce water stress in the scion while the graft union forms.

== History of vegetable grafting ==
Grafting of woody plants has been common for centuries, but herbaceous grafting has only become popular recently in agricultural systems. The cultivation of grafted vegetable plants began in Korea and Japan at the end of the 1920s when watermelon plants were grafted onto squash rootstock. Since this time, this technique has spread throughout Asia and Europe. Currently, 81% of Korean and 54% of Japanese vegetable cultivation uses grafting. The use of this cultural technique is mainly carried out for intensive cropping systems like greenhouse and tunnel production. This method is especially popular for vegetable production in the orient, and the number of vegetables in 1998 was estimated to be 540 million transplants in Korea and 750 million in Japan. This technique has moved to the Mediterranean region as well, where the use of grafting has been proposed as a major component of an integrated management strategy for managing soilborne disease and increasing crop productivity. Grafted tomato transplant production has increased in Spain from less than one million plants in 1999–2000 to over 45 million plants in 2003–2004. Grafted tomato is also cultivated in France and Italy, and over 20 million tomato plants were grafted in Morocco in 2004 as a way to reduce soilborne disease and increase crop production.

Grafting can take place on a number of crops. However, because of the added expense, it is typically associated with melons, cucurbits, and members of the family Solanaceae such as eggplant and tomato. Tomato grafting became popular in the 1960s as a way to reduce certain diseases caused by soilborne plant pathogens such as Raletonia solanacearum. Currently, however, grafting is used to offer not only protection from certain diseases, but also tolerance to abiotic stress like flooding, drought, and salinity.

== Fruit yield ==
The first grafts in the early 20th century were made in order to diminish attacks by infectious organisms, such as Fusarium oxysporum on watermelons. However, research has shown that this technique can be effective against a variety of fungal, bacterial, viral, and nematode diseases. Furthermore, many researchers are looking to utilize specific rootstocks as an alternative to methyl bromide-a soil fumigant that has been widely used until recently. Grafting has been highly effective at overcoming abiotic sources of stress, such as soil salinity, temperature extremes, and excessive soil moisture. Grafting has also been utilized to reduce the effects of flooding in areas where a wet season may occur.

Grafting tomatoes with tolerant rootstocks has been highly effective at producing a saline-tolerant plants. Research indicates that several rootstocks prevent the translocation of sodium and chloride into the shoot. Many of the most economically important vegetable crops like tomato, squash, cucumber, and watermelon are highly sensitive to thermal stress in the roots throughout vegetative development and reproduction. Whether using rootstock tolerant of hot or cold temperatures, the use of temperature tolerant rootstocks often leads to the extension of the growing season in either direction, resulting in better yield and economic stability through the year. Although the vegetable grafting is typically associated with reduction of disease or abiotic stress, yield is often increased without the presence of these identified sources of stress.

In tomatoes, increases in fruit yield are typically the results of increased fruit size. Research has shown that possible mechanisms for increased yield are likely due to increased water and nutrient uptake among vigorous rootstock genotypes. Conductance through the stoma was improved in tomato plants when grafted onto vigorous rootstock. Nutrient uptake for the macronutrients, such as phosphorus and nitrogen, were enhanced by grafting.

== Tomato grafting methods ==
There are a variety of methods for grafting vegetable crops. Cleft grafting occurs when a V-shape is cut into the rootstock and a complementing wedge-shaped scion is inserted. The graft is then held with a small clip until healing occurs. Approach grafting involves notching opposing sides of the stems of the rootstock and scion, and then using a clip to hold the stems together while they fuse. Once the graft has healed, the original scion is then cut off of the desired rootstock and the unused rootstock is detached from the scion. Micrografting is a new technique that has been recently integrated into micropropagation production for hybrid tomato. This method uses micropropagated scion shoots that grafted onto 3 week-old rootstock seedlings. The most common commercial technique for grafting tomato is tube grafting. Tube grafting takes place when the scion and rootstock are severed as seedlings and reattached with a small, silicone tube or clip. This technique has been highly effective as it can be carried out when plants are very small, thereby eliminating the need for large healing chambers while increasing the output. Tube grafting has been adopted as the primary method for vegetable grafting on the farm as it can be easily carried out with small healing chambers with typical success rates ranging from 85 to 90 percent.

- Approach grafting is done by cutting opposing and complementary notches in the stem of the rootstock and scion. The complementary notches are fit together and held with a spring clip or some type of tape. Once the graft union has healed, the root system is cut from the scion plant and the shoot is removed from the rootstock plant.
- Cleft grafting is carried out when the plants are slightly larger, and a V-shaped cut is made in the stem of the scion. The scion is then inserted into the rootstock, which has a vertical slice cut down the center of the stem. The rootstock and scion are then held together by a spring clip while the graft union forms.
- Tube grafting or Japanese top-grafting is carried out when the plants are very small and the rootstock and scion are held together with a 1.5–2 mm silicone clip or tube.
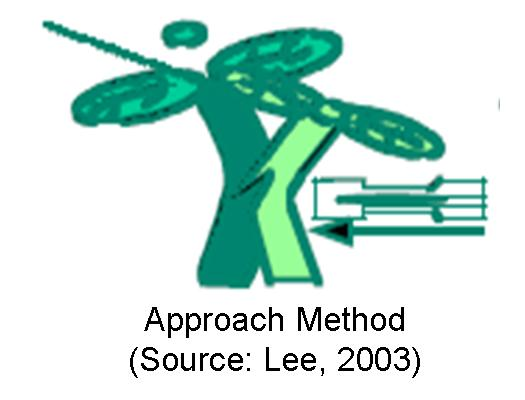
Approach grafting (Lee, 2003)

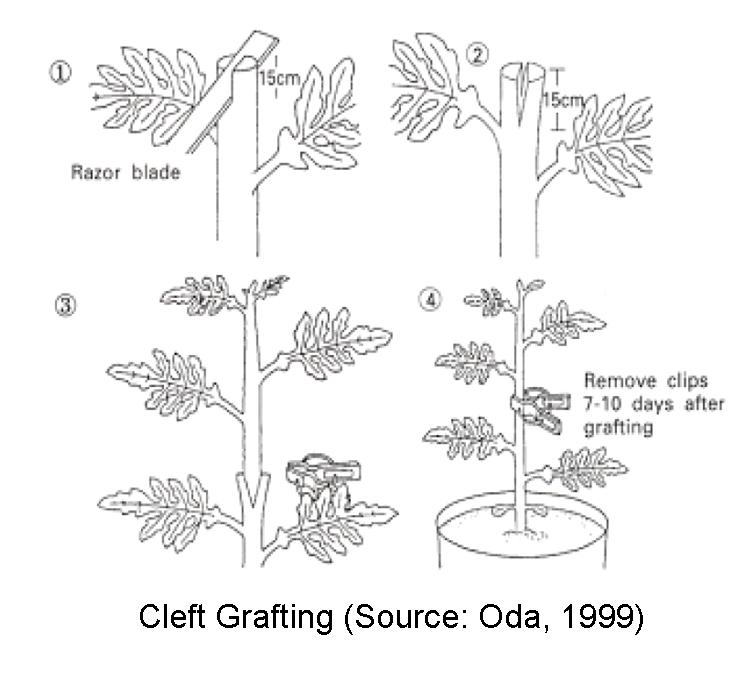
Cleft grafting (Oda, 1999)

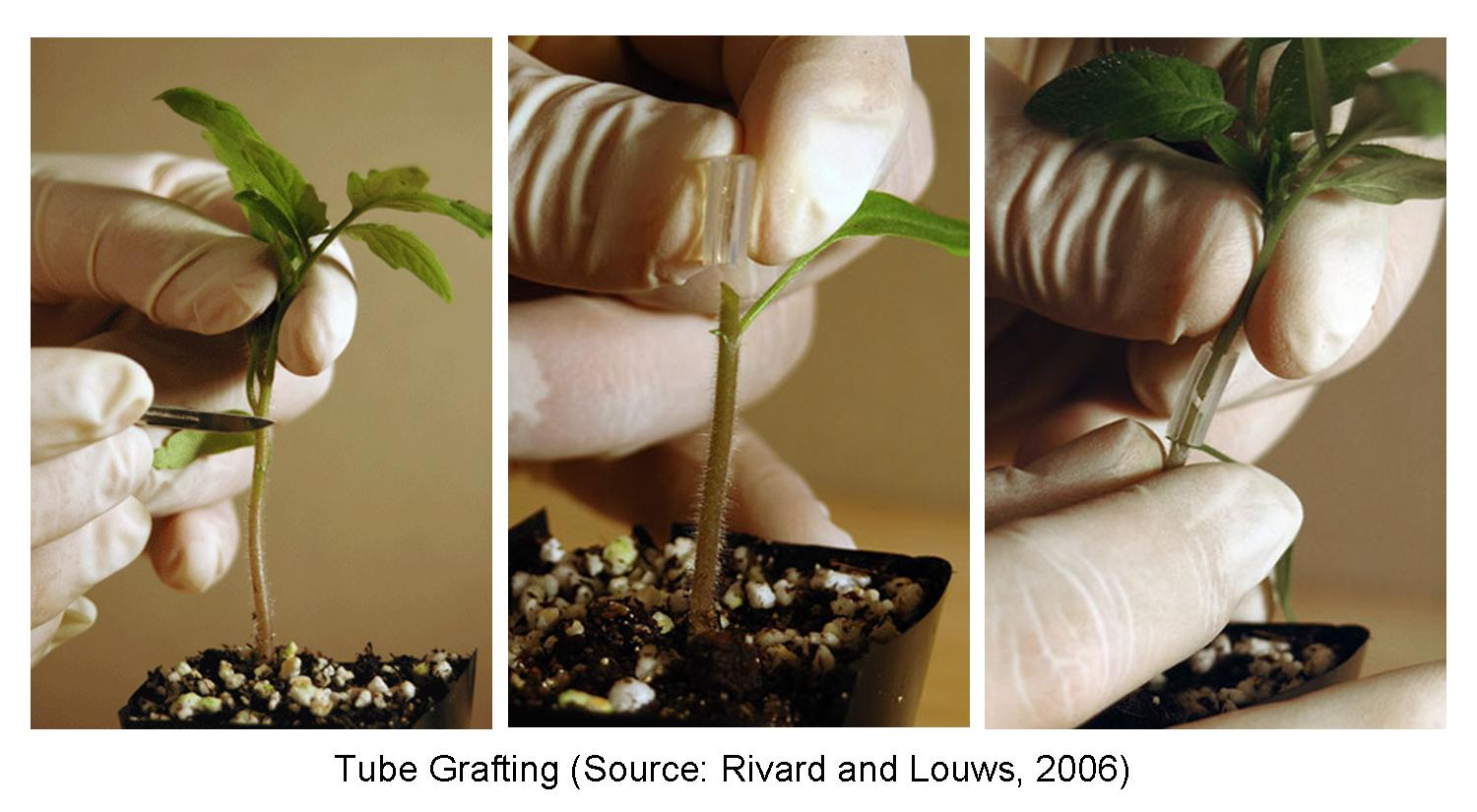
Tube grafting (Rivard and Louws, 2006)

== See also ==
- Pomato – Hybrid plant that can grow potatoes and tomatoes
