= Pomato =

Hybrid plant that can grow potatoes and tomatoes

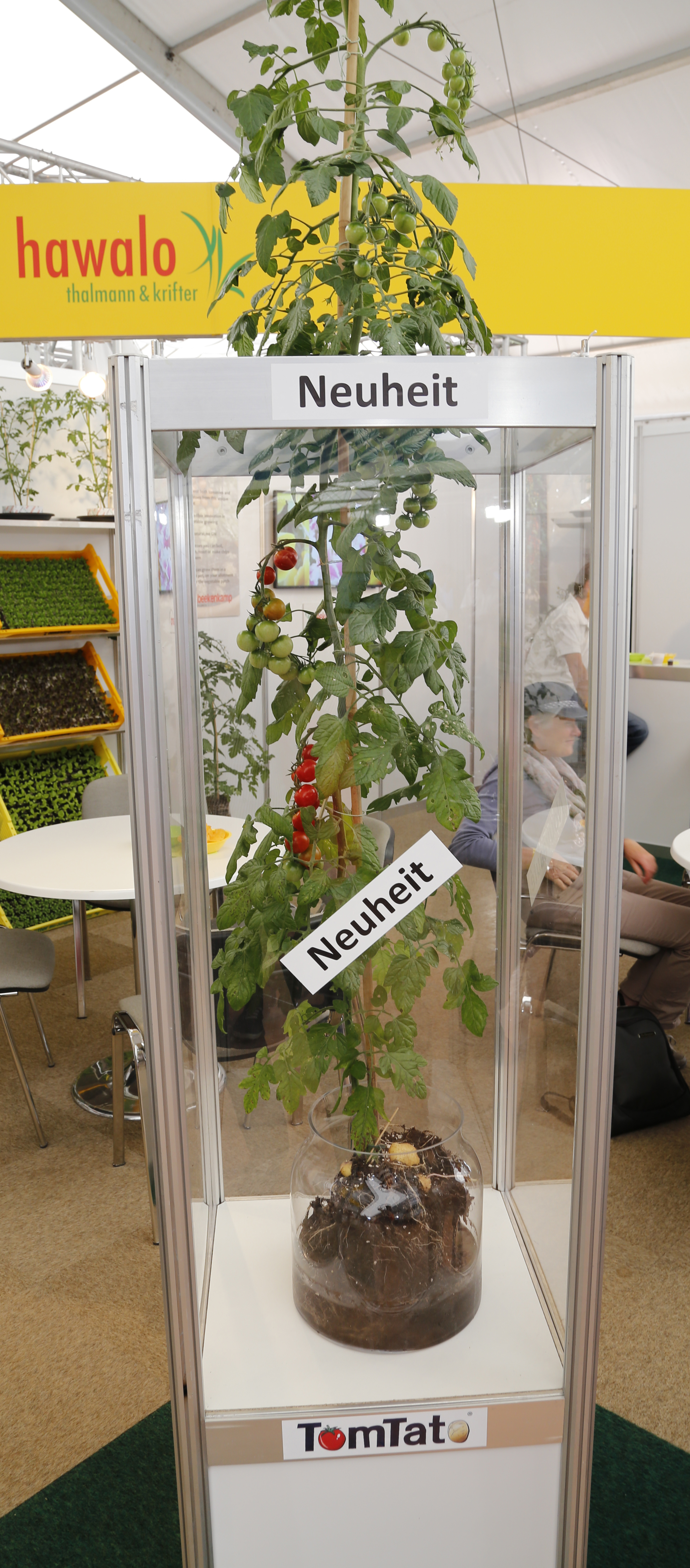
A pomato (sold as TomTato) in a store display

The pomato (a portmanteau of potato and tomato), also known as a tomtato, is a hybrid plant that is able to grow both tomatoes and potatoes. The most common method of creating a pomato is grafting together a tomato plant and a potato plant, both of which are members of the Solanum genus in the Solanaceae (nightshade) family. Another method is somatically fusing the two plants together. Cherry tomatoes grow on the vine, while white potatoes grow in the soil from the same plant.

== Background ==
The concept of grafting related potatoes and tomatoes so that both are produced on the same plant dates back to at least 1833.

As with all grafts, this plant will not occur in nature and cannot be grown from seed, because the two parts of the plant remain genetically separate, and only rely on each other for nourishment and growth. As in most standard types of plant grafting, a small incision is made in the stem of each plant and they are strapped together. Once the cuts have healed and the plants are joined, the leafy top of the potato plant can be cut away and the roots of the tomato can be removed, leaving the leaves of the tomato plant to nourish the roots of the potato plant. The rootstock (potato) acts as a stable and healthy root system and the scions (tomato) are chosen for their fruit, flowers or leaves. The tomatoes should be ready to harvest after about 12 weeks during the summer months; the potatoes should be ready after the tomato leaves begin to die back, normally in early autumn. Grafting in this way can be used to produce many different related crops from the same plant, for example the increasingly popular 'fruit salad' tree, which is a single tree that produces multiple types of citrus fruits, or a tree with a variety of fruits with stones (peach, plum, etc.).

The somatic fusion of potato and tomato cells is also possible, though this plant cannot produce fertile seeds. The first such somatic hybrid was bred in 1978.

== Benefits ==
Pomato plants have been seen as a new technology to make food production more efficient, as they maximize the number of crops that can be produced on a piece of land or in a small urban environment like a balcony. This has significant impacts on developing countries like Kenya, where farmers can save on space, time and labor, without affecting the quality of their produce, by growing pomato plants. In addition, grafting can improve resistance to bacteria, viruses and fungi, attract a more diverse group of pollinators and provide a sturdy trunk for delicate ornamental plants.

== Commercial products ==
Grafted pomato plants were launched in the United Kingdom in September 2013 by the horticultural mail-order company Thompson & Morgan, who sold pre-grafted plants branded as the "TomTato". The Incredible Edible nursery in New Zealand announced a "DoubleUP Potato Tom" in the same month. Thompson & Morgan say that this was the first time the plant had been produced commercially; director Paul Hansord said he got the TomTato idea 15 years before in the US, when visiting a garden where someone had planted a potato under a tomato as a joke.

== See also ==
- Tomacco – Recreations of Products from The Simpsons
