= Inosculation =

Natural phenomenon in which trunks, branches, or roots of two trees grow together

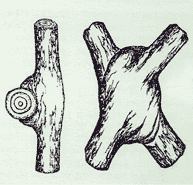
Inosculated branches drawn by Arthur Wiechula (19th century)

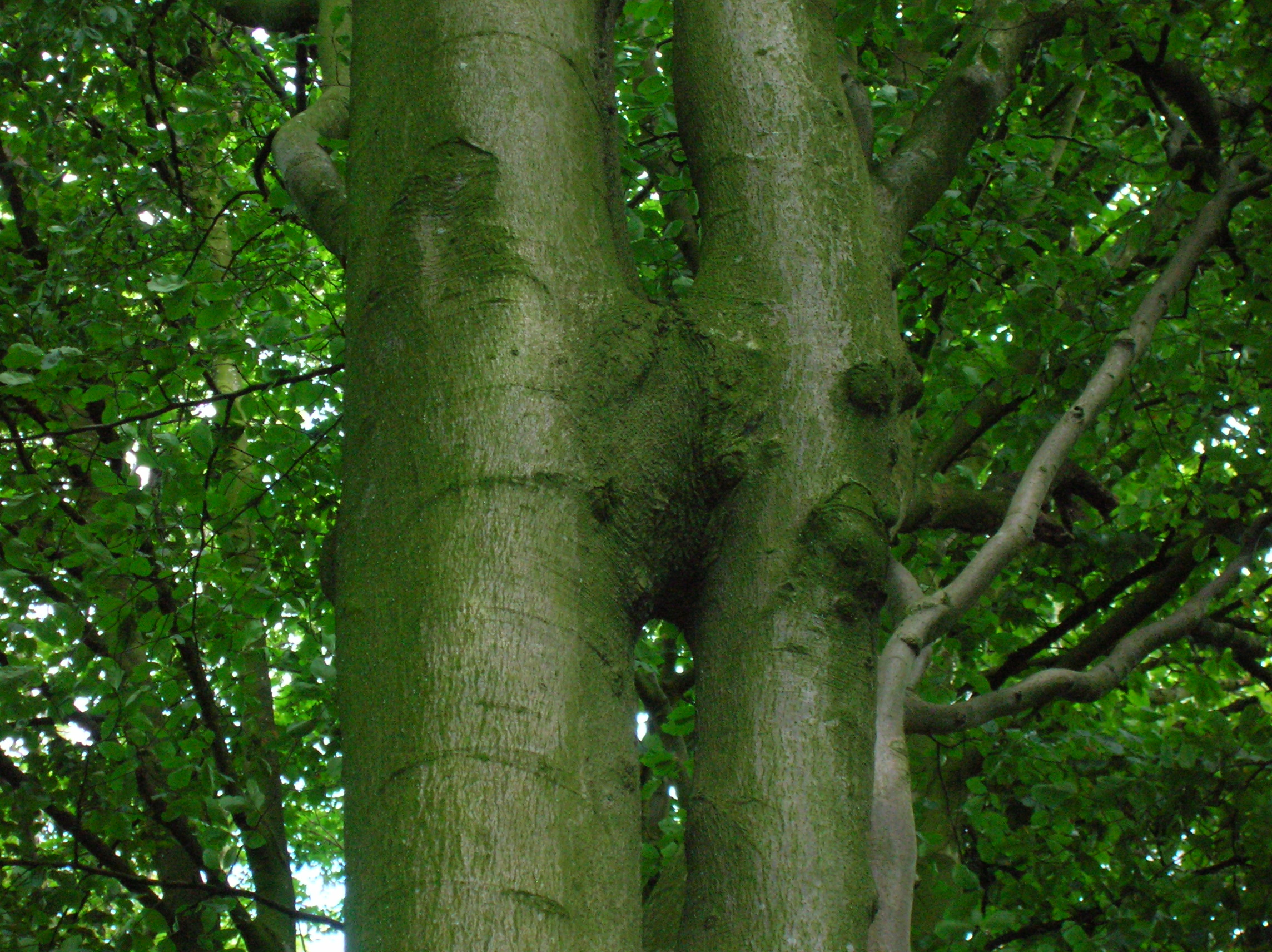
Beech tree trunks conjoined

Inosculation (Note: from the Latin roots in + ōsculārī, "to kiss into/inward/against" or etymologically and more illustratively "to make a small mouth inward/into/against") is a natural phenomenon in which trunks, branches or roots of two trees grow together in a manner biologically similar to the artificial process of grafting. It customarily results when tree limbs are braided or pleached. The branches first grow separately in proximity to each other until they touch. At this point, the bark on the touching surfaces is gradually abraded away as the trees move in the wind. Once the cambium of two trees touches, they sometimes self-graft and grow together as they expand in diameter.

In forestry, gemels (from the Latin word for "a pair") are trees that have undergone the process. Inosculation can happen across related species, but occurs most commonly for branches of two trees of the same species.

== Species ==
Inosculation is most common among the following taxa due to their thin bark:

- Apple
- Almond
- Ash
- Beech
- Crepe myrtle
- Chestnut
- Dogwood
- Elm
- Ficus
- Grape
- Hazelnut
- Hornbeam
- Laburnum
- Linden
- Maple
- Norway spruce
- Olive
- Peach
- Pear
- Privet
- River red gum
- Sycamore
- Willow
- Wisteria

== Conjoined trees ==
Two trees may grow to their mature size adjacent to each other and seemingly grow together or conjoin, demonstrating inosculation. These may be of the same species or even of different genera or families, depending on whether the two trees have become truly grafted together (once the cambium of two trees touches, they self-graft and grow together). Usually grafting is only between two trees of the same or closely related species or genera, but the appearance of grafting can be given by two trees that are physically touching, rubbing, intertwined, or entangled. Both conifers and deciduous trees can become conjoined. Beech trees in particular are frequent conjoiners, as is blackthorn (Prunus spinosa).

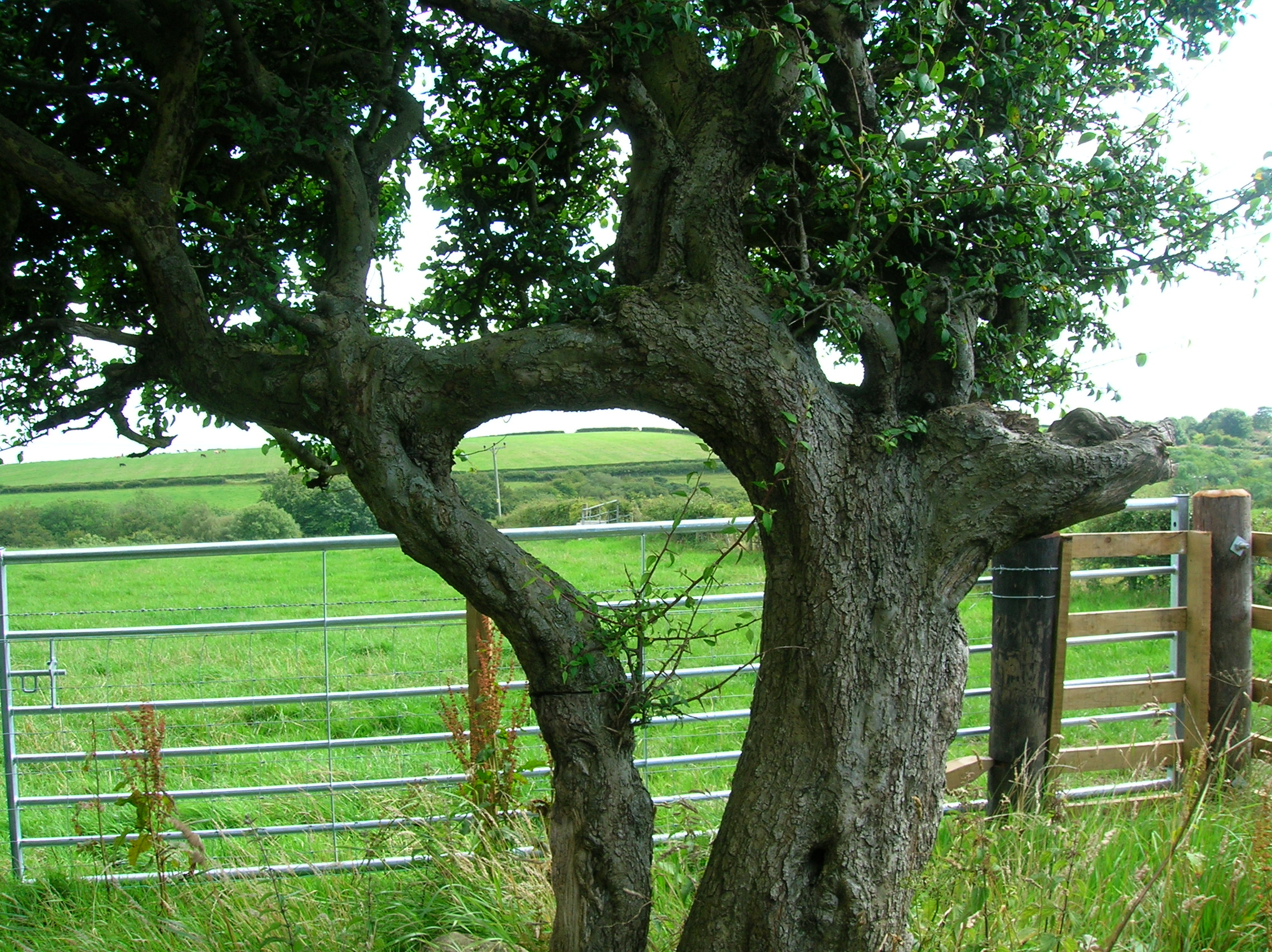
A "husband and wife" blackthorn (Prunus spinosa) at Lynncraigs farm, Dalry, North Ayrshire, Scotland

Such trees are often colloquially referred to as "husband and wife" trees, or "marriage trees". The straightforward application of the term comes from the obvious unification of two separate individual trees, although a more humorous use of the term relates to the sexually suggestive appearance of some natural examples. There may be a degree of religious intent, as some cults are organized around beliefs that trees contain a hidden or sacred power to cure or to enhance fertility, or that they contain the souls of ancestors or of the unborn.

=== Examples ===
On his Tour of Scotland, published in 1800, T. Garnett notes a tree near Inveraray that the locals called the Marriage tree, formed from a lime tree with two trunks that have been joined by a branch in the manner of a person putting an arm around another (see illustration) as would a married couple.

On the way to the Heavenly Lake near Urumqi in China are a pair of trees that local people have called the Husband and Wife trees because they are connected by a living branch. The Tatajia Husband and Wife trees are in Taiwan and in Yakushima, Kagoshima-ken, Japan, are a pair of Husband and Wife trees formed from conjoined cedars.

In Lambeg, Co. Down, slightly north of Wolfenden's Bridge, stand two beech trees (see 'Gallery') at the entrance to Chrome Hill, on the Lambeg to Ballyskeagh road. In the late 18th century, John Wesley was staying at Chrome Hill and decided to weave together two young beech trees to act as a symbol of unity between the Methodist Church and the Church of Ireland.

At Doonholm near Ayr an ancient sycamore maple (Acer pseudoplatanus) was famous for the multiple fusion of its boughs that gave it a unique appearance and greatly strengthened it.

== Gallery ==
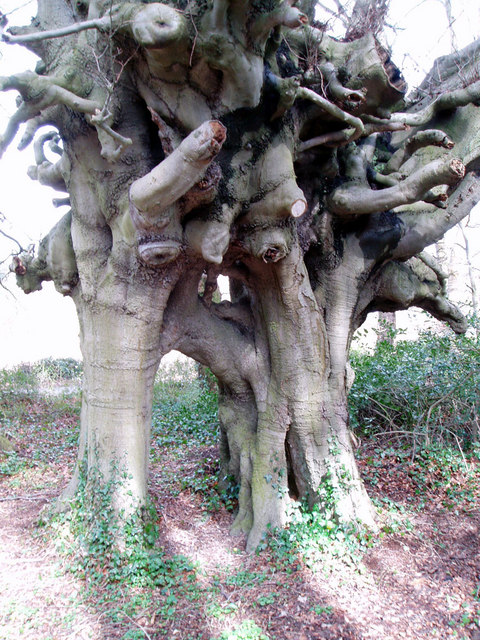
The John Wesley tree

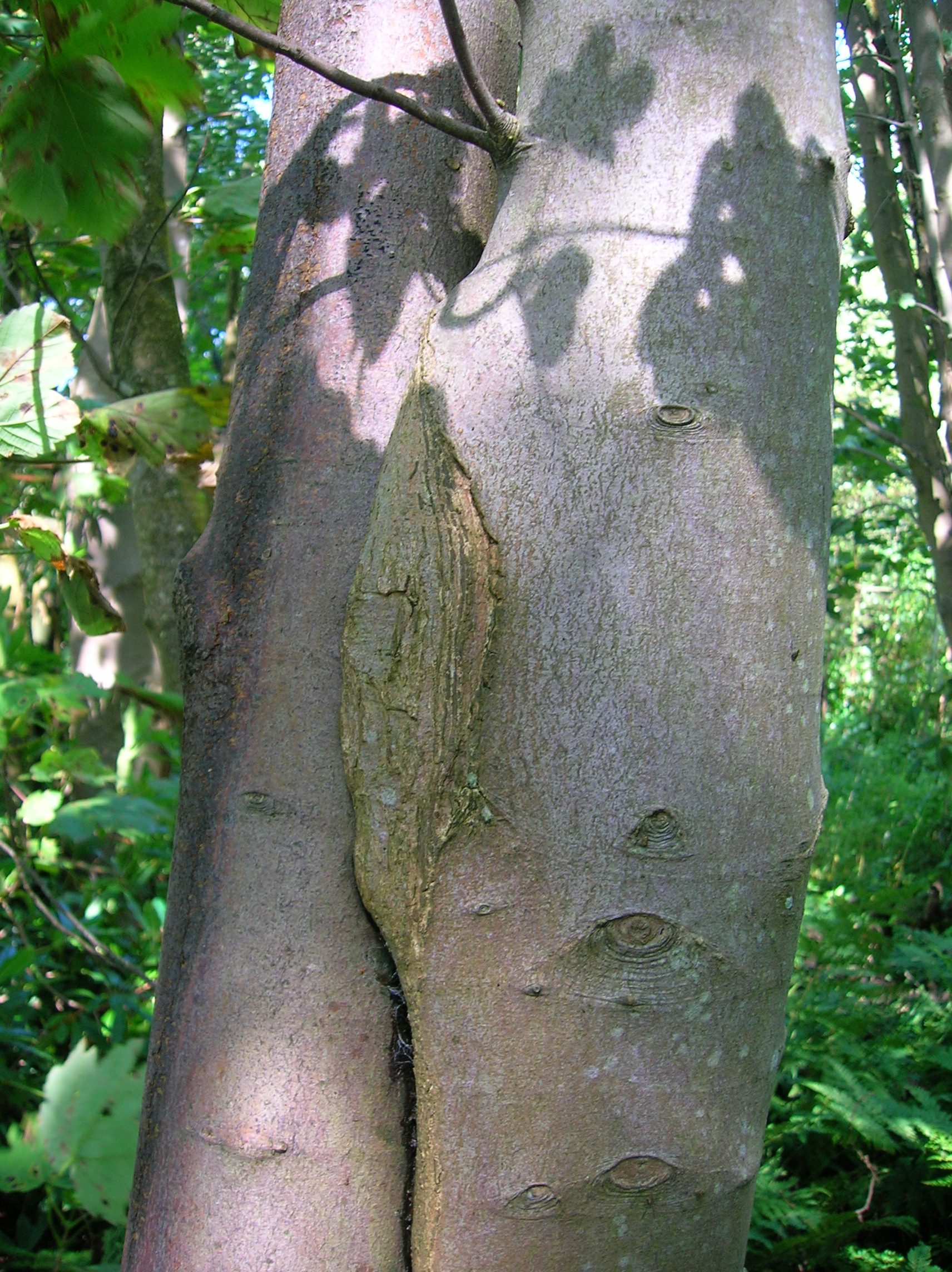
Conjoined sycamore maples

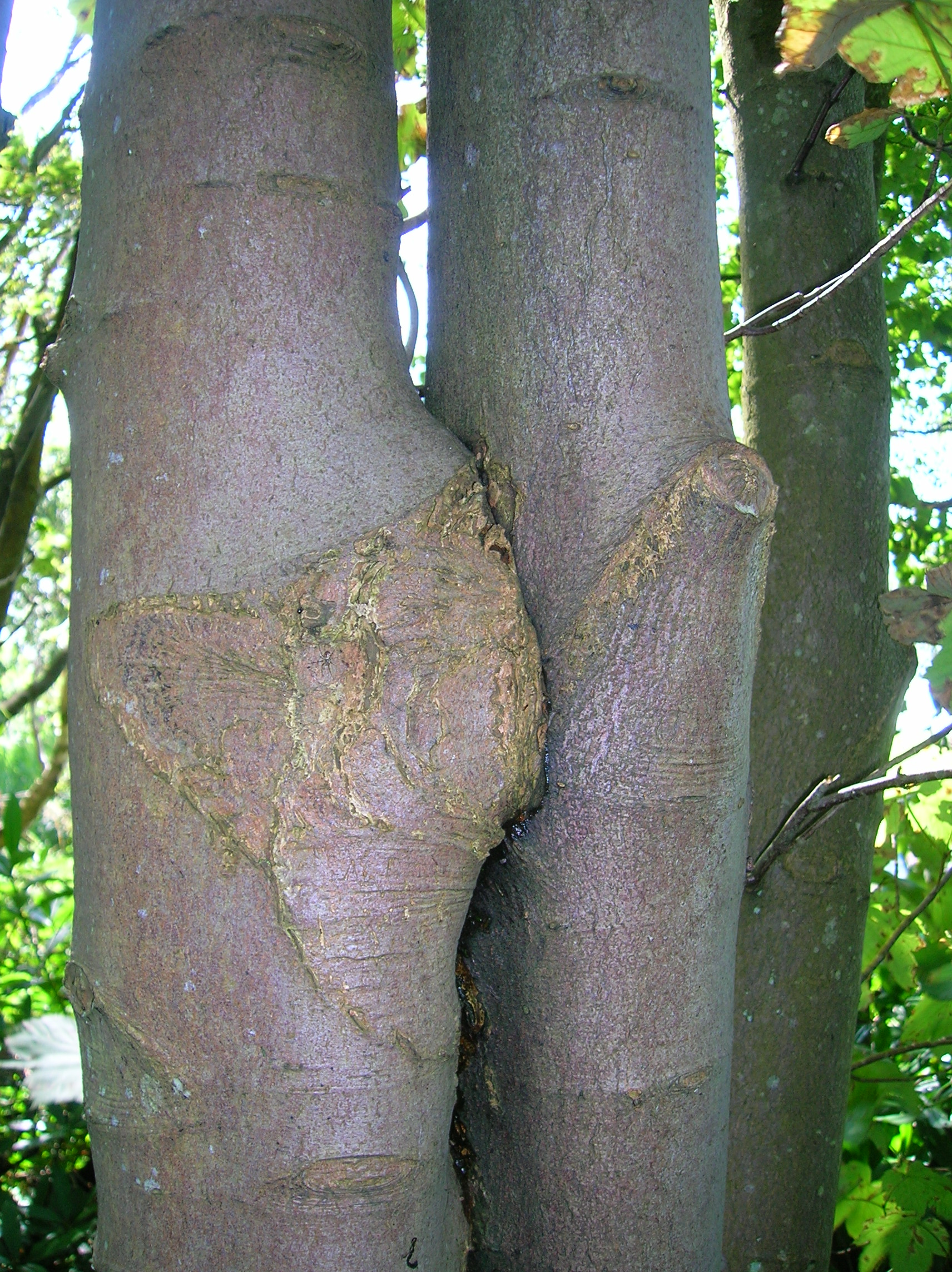
Acer pseudoplatanus showing inosculation

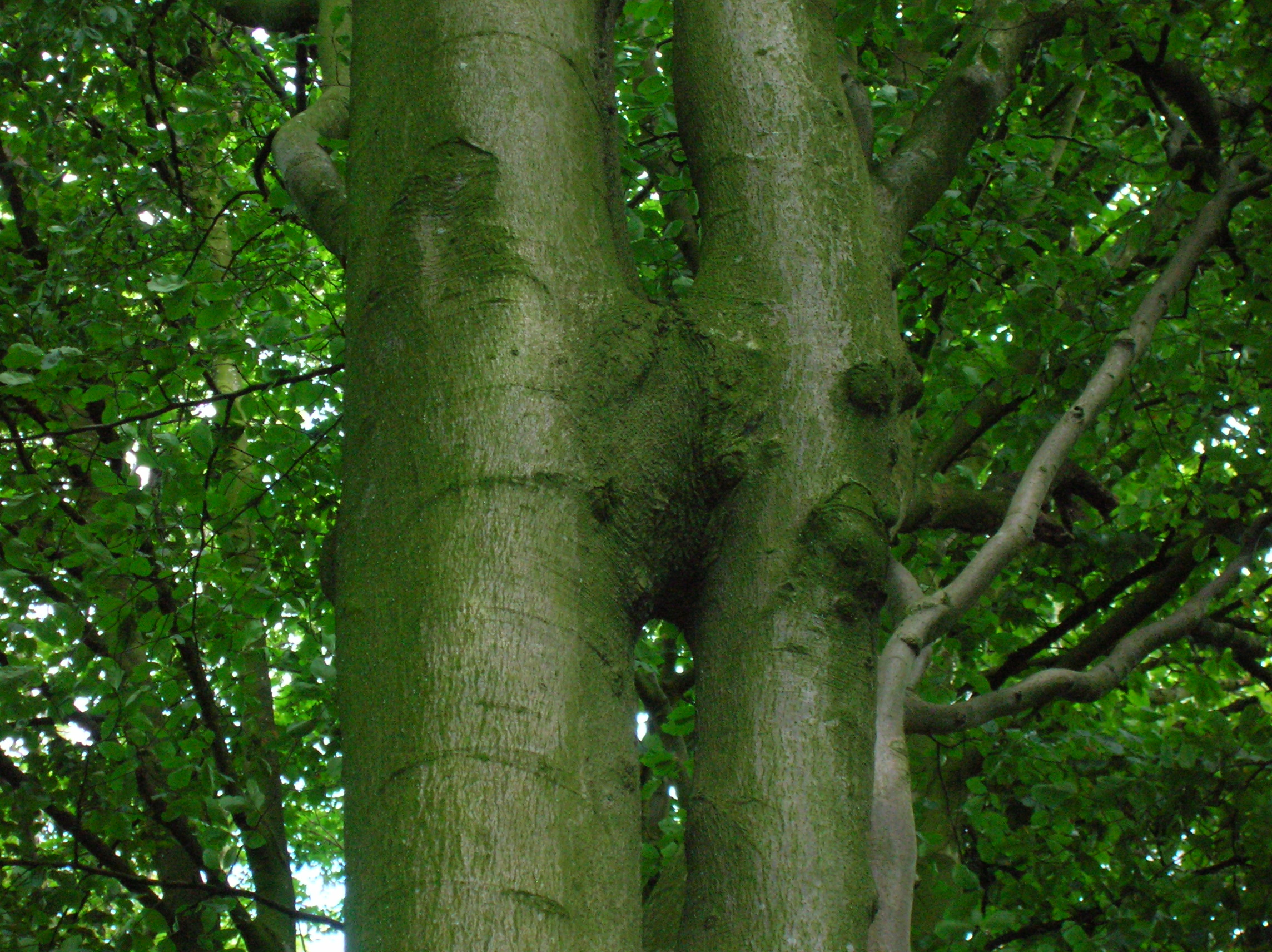
Beech tree trunks conjoined

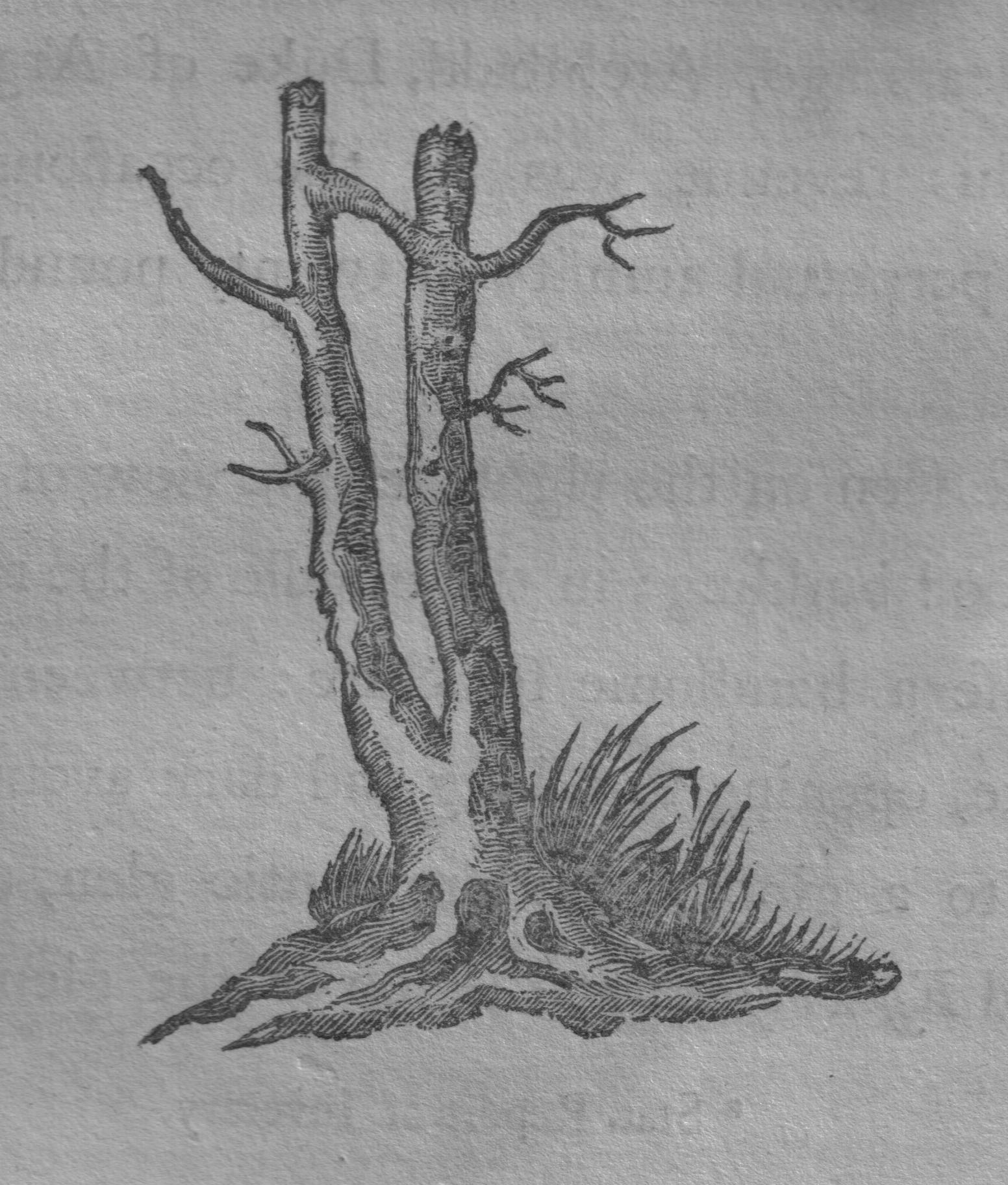
Garnett's 18th century "Marriage tree"

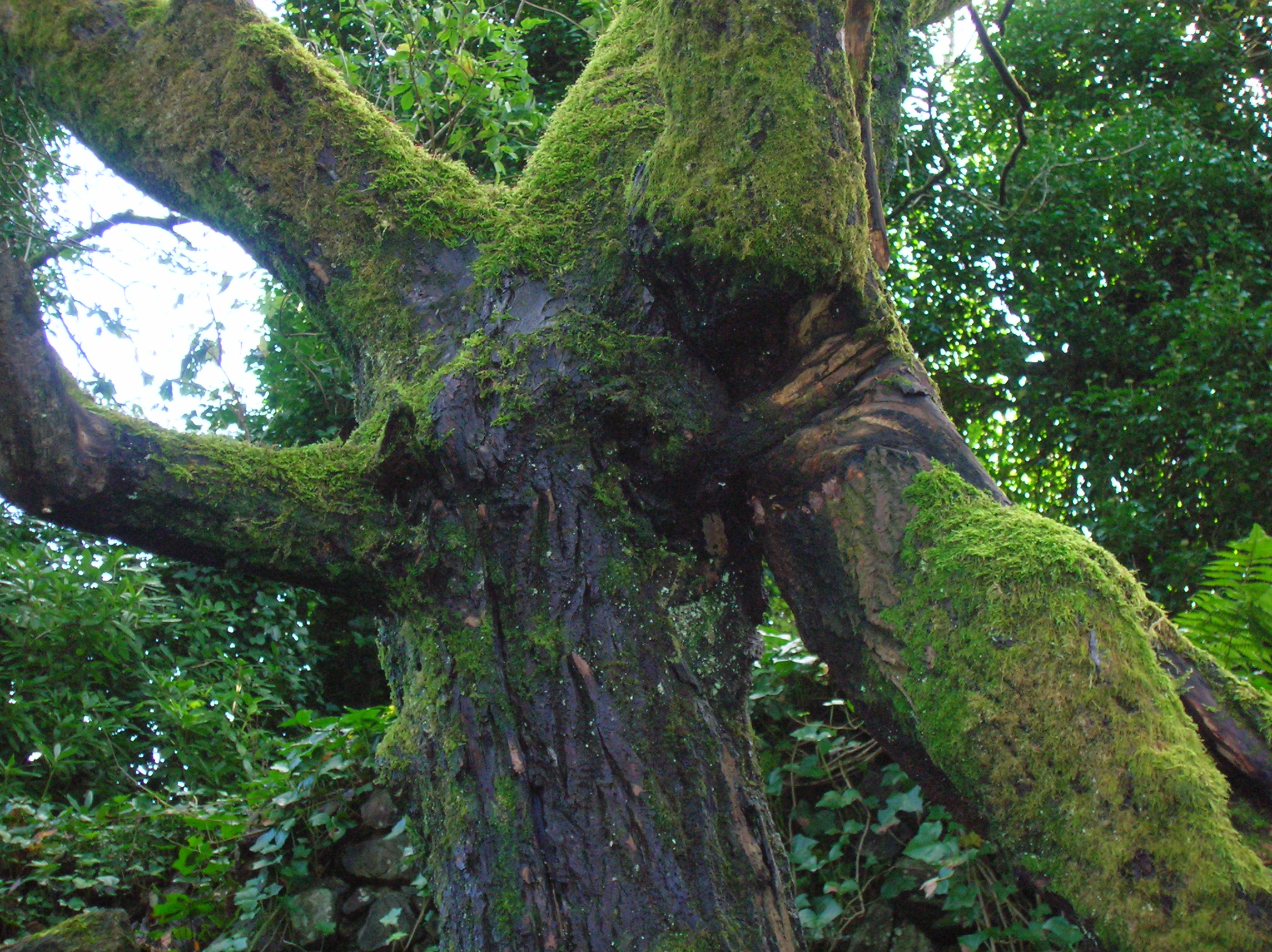
Inosculation of willow (Salix sp.)

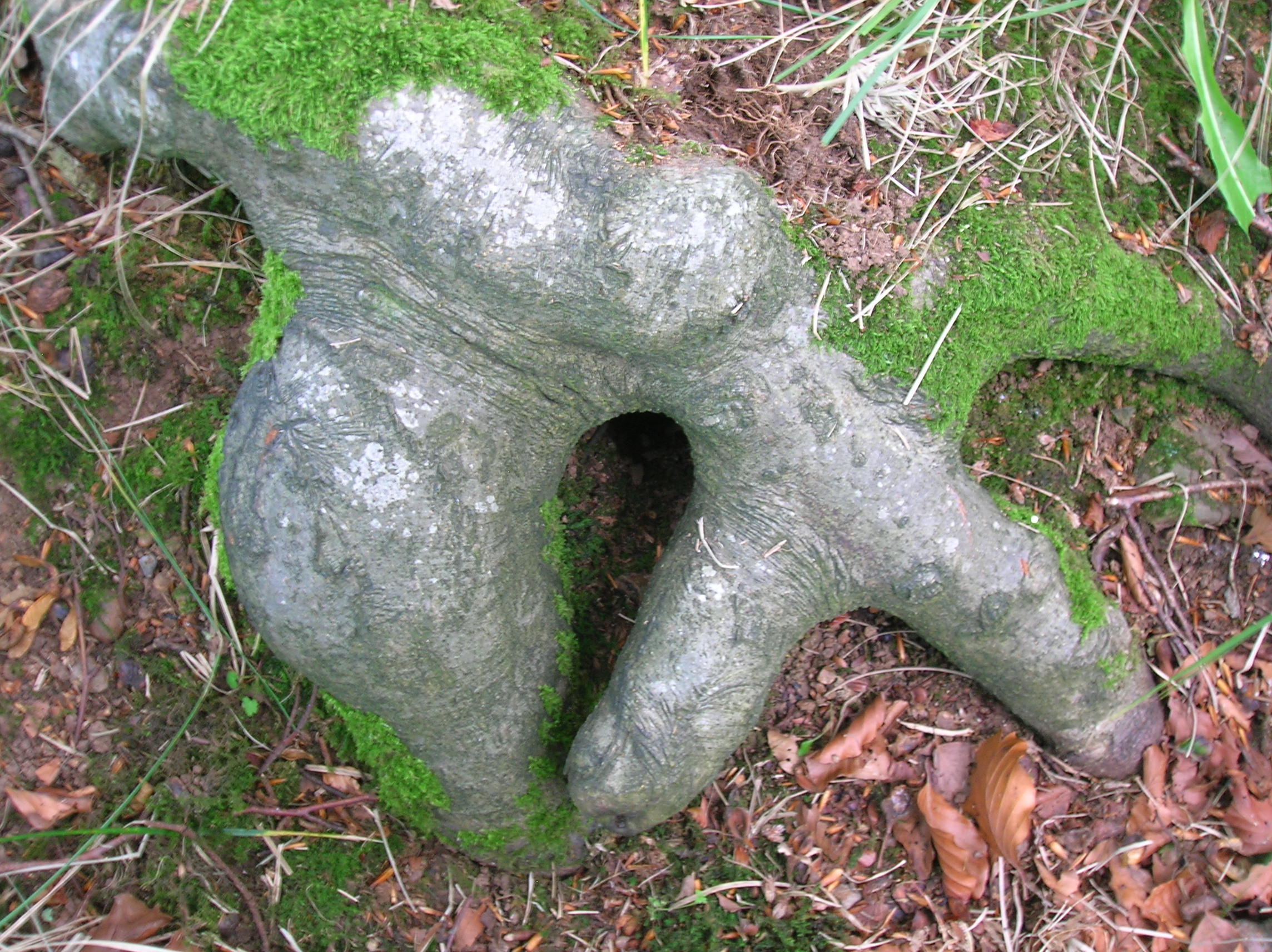
Conjoined beech tree roots

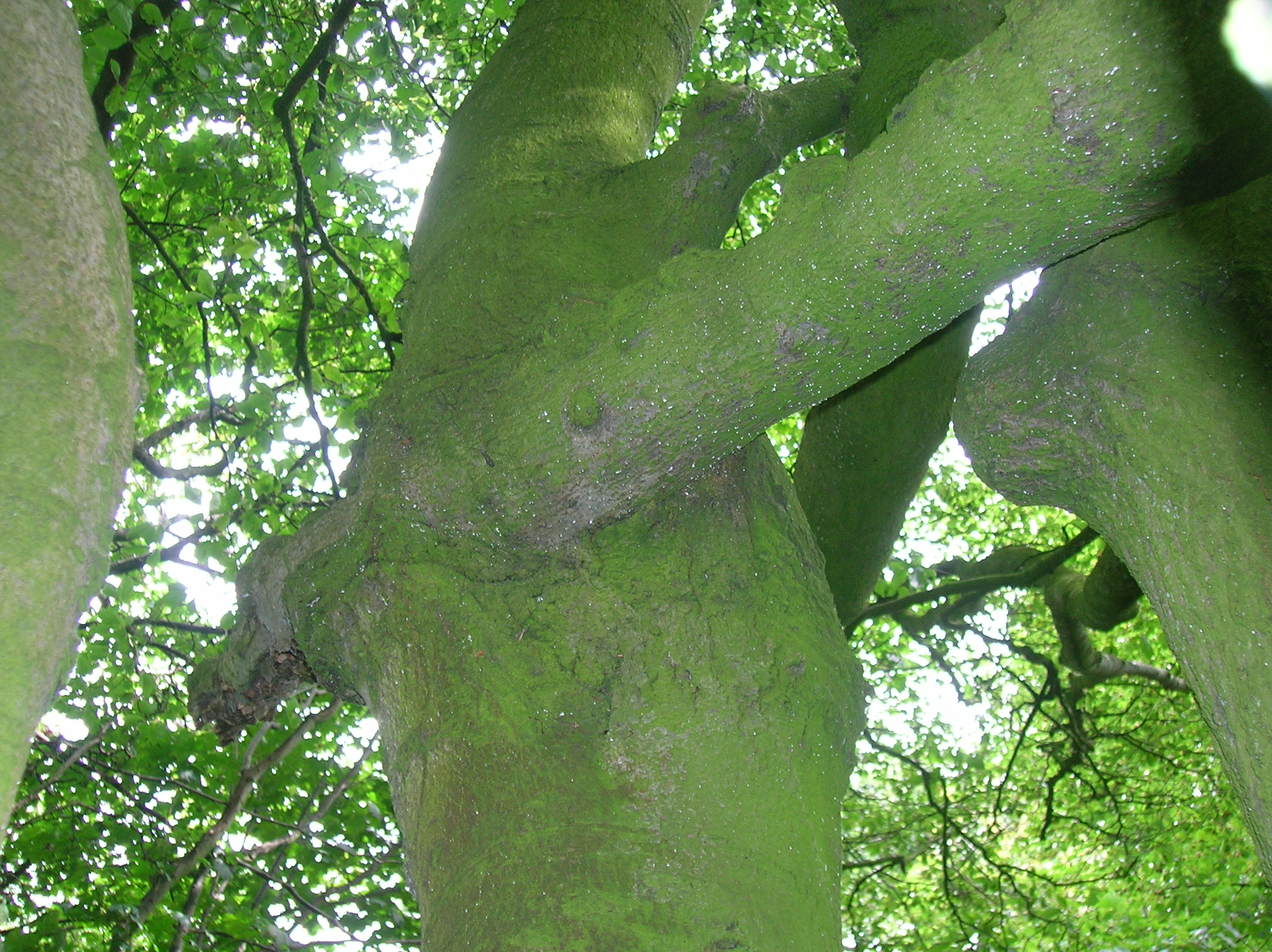
A classic "husband and wife" tree with branches conjoined

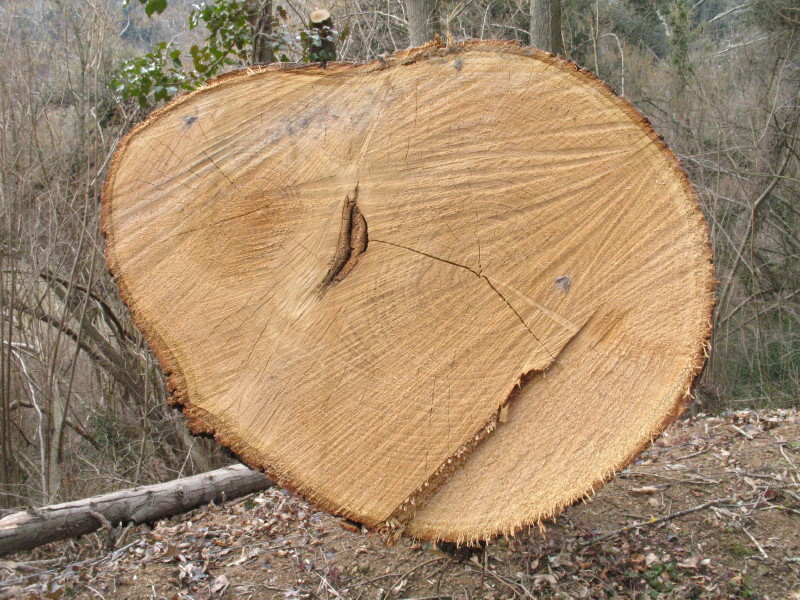
Fused chestnut trees showing a bark pocket (Castanea sativa)

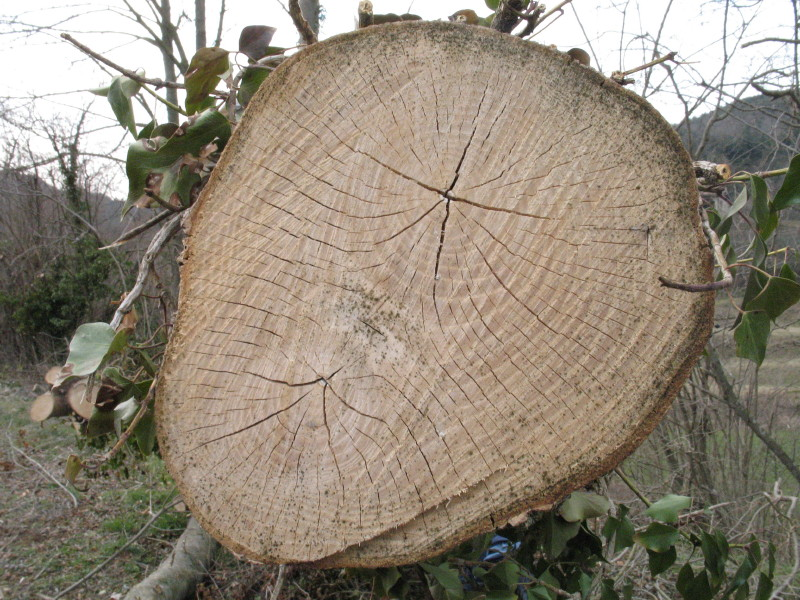
Fused ash trees (Fraxinus excelsior)

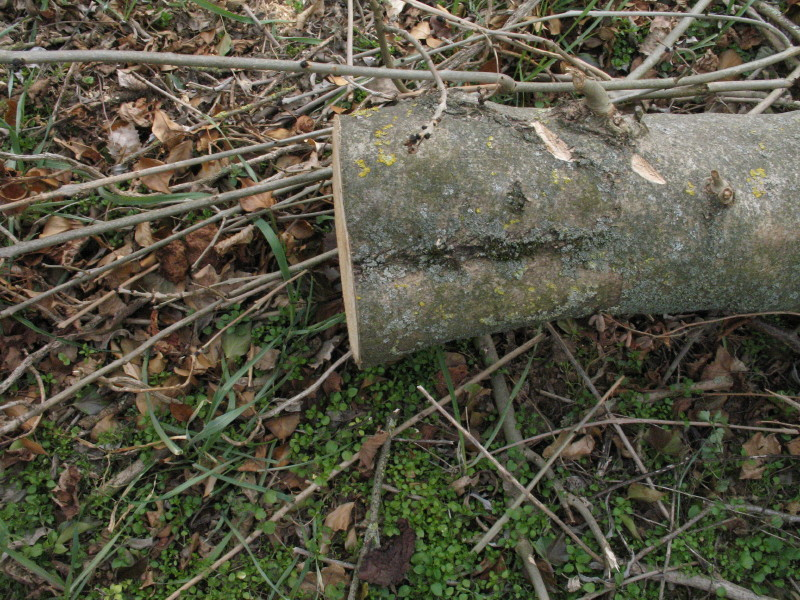
Fused ash trees, side view (Fraxinus excelsior)

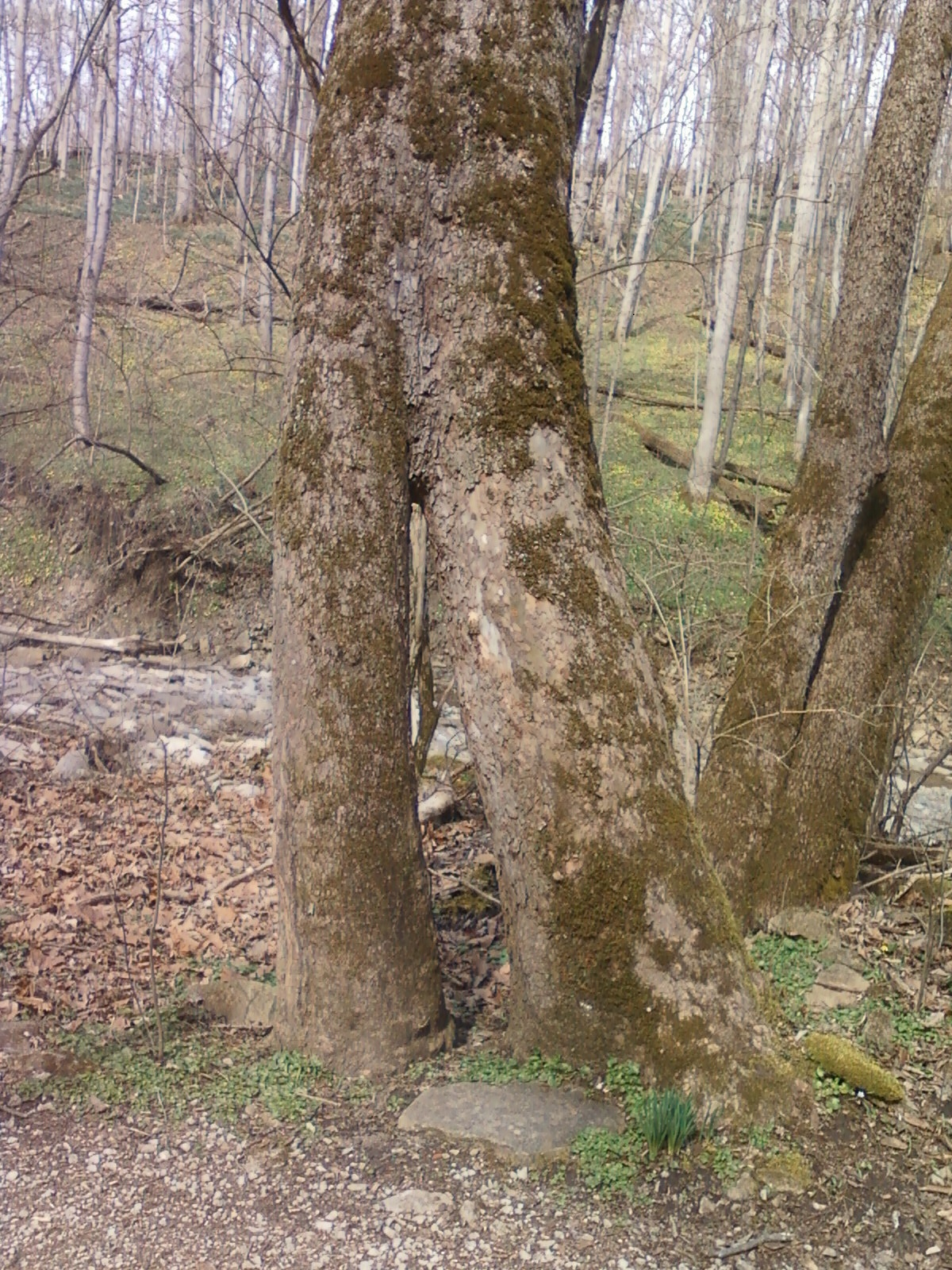
Fused sycamore trees (Platanus occidentalis)

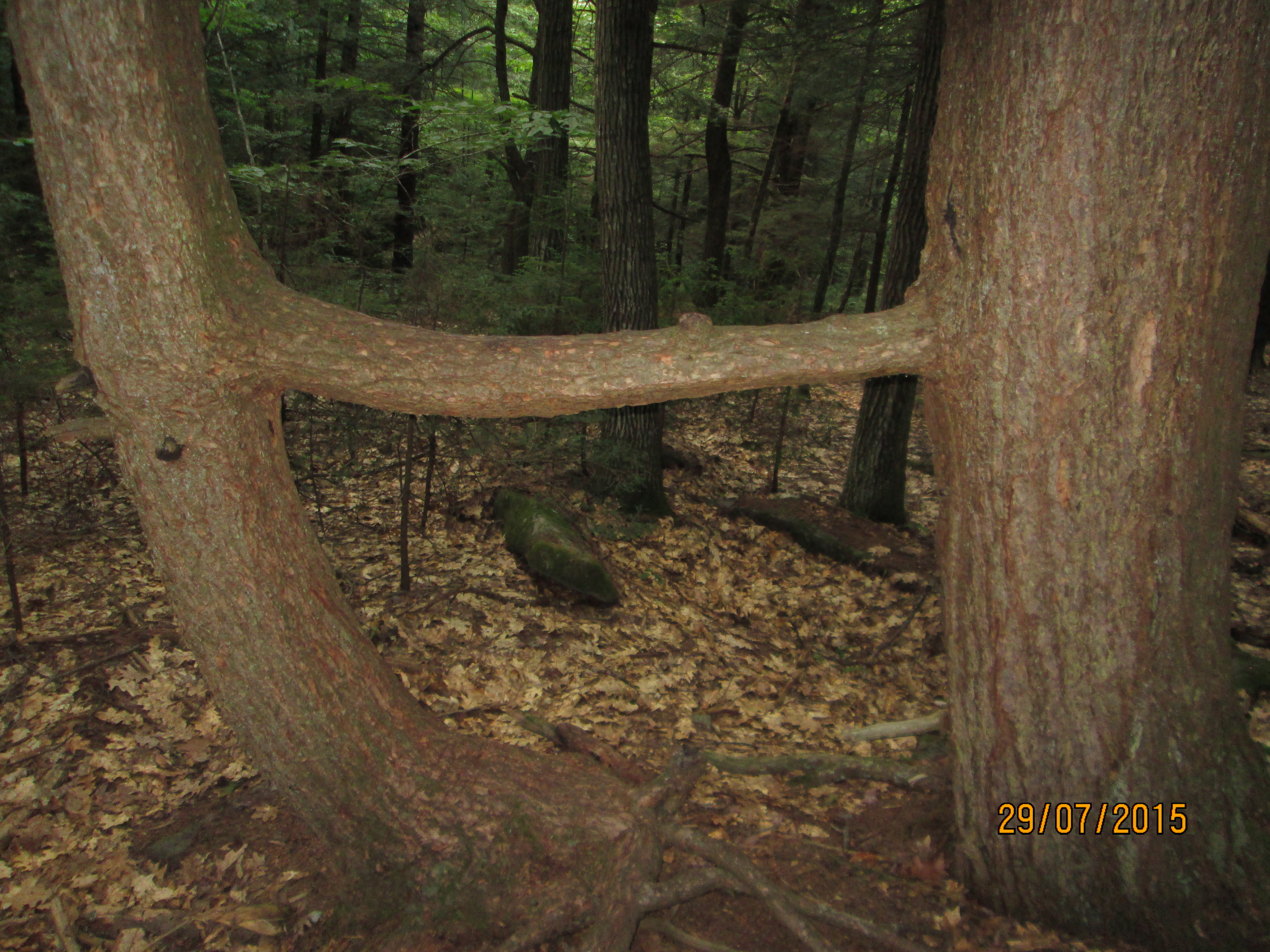
In Vermont

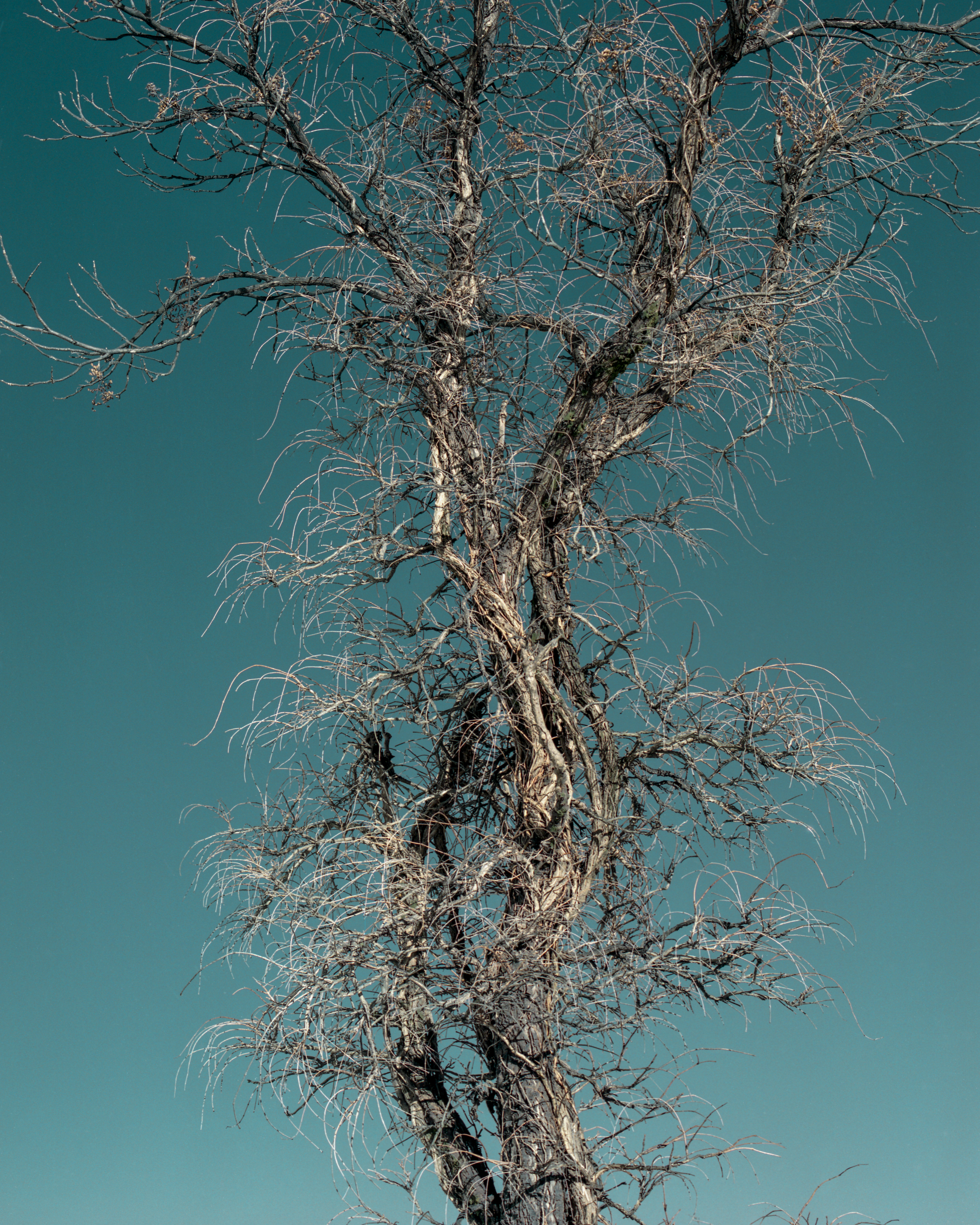
The fused tree looks like a single tree.

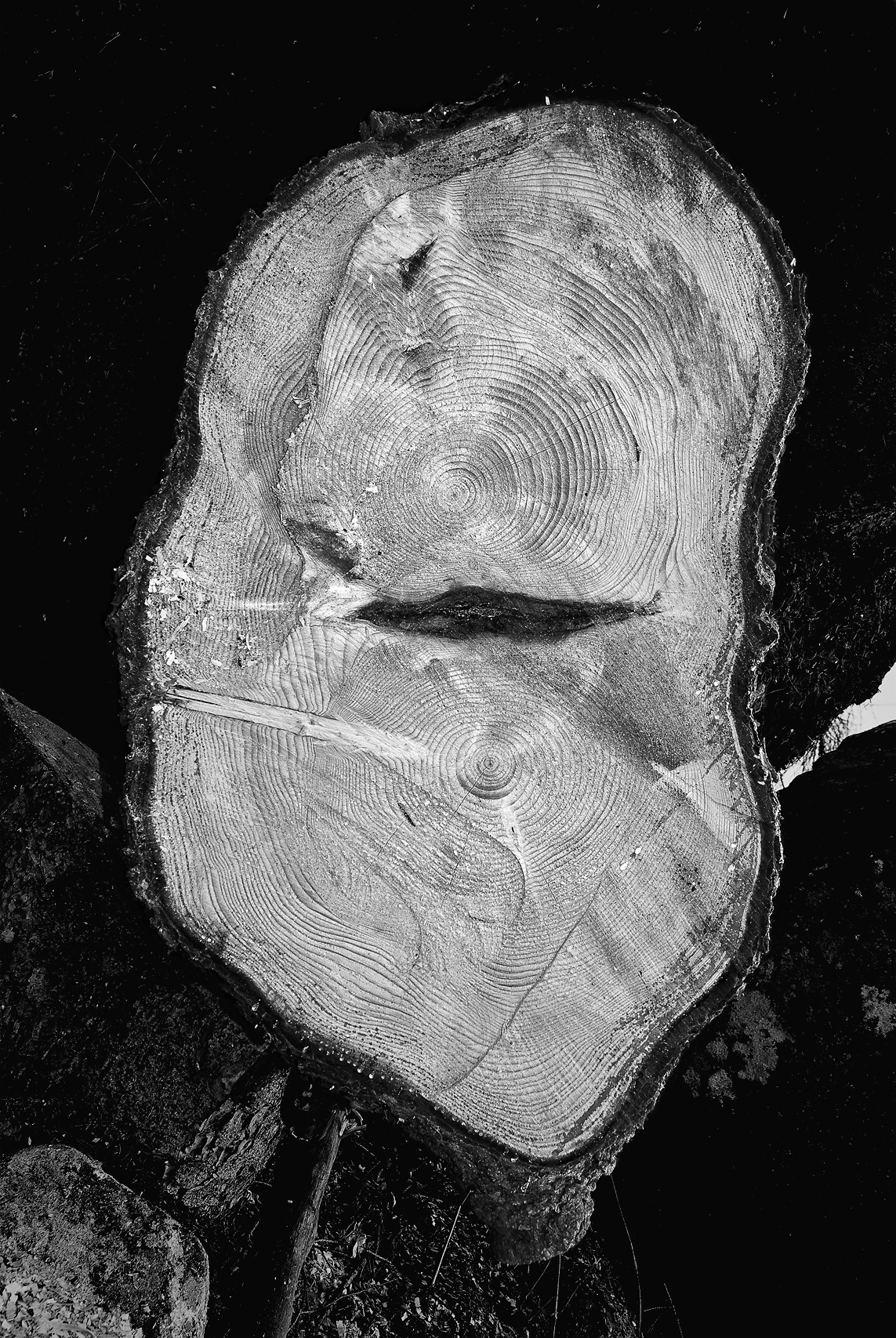
Inosculation case, Picea abies (European spruce), Dolomites

== See also ==
- Axel Erlandson
- Tree shaping

== Notes ==
=== Sources ===
- Garnett, T. (1800). Observations on a Tour of the Highlands and part of the Western Isles of Scotland. London: Cadell & Davies.
- MacArthur, Wilson (1952). The River Doon. London: Cassell & Co. Ltd.
- Morton, John (1712). The Natural History of Northhamptonshire. London: R. Knaplock.
