= Holzer Permaculture =

Holzer Permaculture is a branch of permaculture developed in Austria by Sepp Holzer independently from the mainstream permaculture. It is particularly noteworthy because it grew out of practical application and was relatively detached from the scientific community.

== Introduction ==
Sepp Holzer started reorganizing his father's property according to ecological patterns in the early 1960s after he took over the farm. As an adolescent, he conducted layman experiments with plants native to the area and learned from his own observations.

Since having taken over his father's property, he has expanded it from 24 to 45 hectares, according to his methods, together with his wife.

His expanded farm now spans over 45 hectares of forest gardens, including 70 ponds, and is said to be the most consistent example of permaculture worldwide. In the past he has experimented with many different animals. As a result of these experiments, there is a huge role for animals in Holzer Permaculture.

He created effective methods of using ponds as reflectors to increase solar gain for passive solar heating of structures, and of using the microclimate created by rock outcrops to effectively change the hardiness zone for nearby plants. He has also done original work in the use of Hügelkultur, and natural branch development instead of pruning, to allow fruit trees to survive high altitudes and harsh winters.

== Comparison to regular permaculture ==
It is difficult to make out differences between the methods and practices of Sepp Holzer in contrast to the more scientific and theoretical permacultural mainstream. Nevertheless, here are some major points to consider:

- His designs are mostly aimed at raising temperatures and creating micro-climates with rocks, ponds, and living wind barriers, in an area with 4 °C on the average and -20 °C in the winter. The ponds he makes do not contain any pond liner. Instead, he makes the ponds watertight by sifting the fine from the coarse soil in the earth pile dug up with the excavator. The excavator is then used to pile only the coarse soil up into walls which are then tamped down using the excavator's bucket. The bottom of the pond, he makes watertight by vibrating the excavator's bucket when the pond has been filled with 30–40 cm of water.
- Another aspect was the necessity of creating terraces on his farm's hillsides leading him to the use of heavy machinery (like excavators). Many of the terraces he construct are also given a humus storage ditch (placed in between the terraces).
- His Hügelkultur technique is the use of raised beds made from bulky material such as tree trunks. On his farm, he made a pick-your-own area where visitors can pick their own produce from the raised beds and then pay for it at a counter upon leaving the area.
- He uses animal labor alongside human labor, working his farm with only two people. He optimizes the natural patterns of animal behavior to reduce human or machine-driven labor. As an example: he uses swine to "plow" new beds for sowing. This is a very effective way of digging, as the only thing he has to do is to throw some corn and fruit on the spot he wants dug up. A couple of days later, he can bring the pigs back to their enclosure and plant new plants in the bed. Holzer is able to successfully grow his plants without using any fertilizer. The animals he uses are all heirloom races, which are hardy and require relatively low maintenance. Some races of swine he uses are Mangalitza, Swabian-Hall Swine, Duroc, and Turopolje. He also keeps quail, capercaillie, hazel grouse, wisent, Scottish highland cattle, Hungarian steppe cattle, Dahomey miniature cattle, American bison, yak, water buffalo. The animals live outside in paddocks/shelters and share space with orchards and forests. Many of the fruit trees in the orchards (especially those on very sloped terrain) are used exclusively to feed the animals. They collect it as it falls to the ground, (hence those trees are not picked nor is their produce sold)
- He also does not prune fruit trees much nor does he cut the lower branches on fruit trees (as this can hurt the tree due to the lignification not being able to complete before frost and the fact that the unpruned fruit trees survives snow loads that will break pruned trees). He also says that leaving the branches on protects the tree against browsing by animals. He does, however, make a point of using deep-rooted pioneer plants such as lupins, sweet clover, lucerne and broom. These crops are said to aerate the soil and make sure no water is left standing near the tree. No use is made of wire meshes as protection against voles, since he states they are not efficient in preventing damage from voles using this technique anyway. He makes no use of contemporary fruit tree cultivars, but only uses hardy, old, local heirloom cultivars. In addition to old cultivars of regular fruit trees, he also plants many fruit tree species that are specific to use in phytotherapy or which can only function as animal feed (i.e. crab apple, wild pear, wild cherry, blackthorn, rowan, wild service, service tree, cornelian cherry, snowy mespilus, among others). Similar to mainstream permaculture, he makes no use of chemical fertilizer or pesticides, at all. Due to the altitude he's at, his trees bear fruit later, meaning he can sell it after most (sealevel) farmers sold their produce. Due to this (and the fact that he produces heirloom fruit varieties, and not regular varieties), he often sells at a higher price. In some cases, customers (such as distilleries) are even willing to pick the fruit themselves, eliminating labour expenses.
- He grows many old cereals on his farm, such as einkorn, emmer, black emmer, spelt, fichtelgebirgshafer, wild rye, black oats, naked oats, barley, Siberian grain (secale cereale, Russian cultivar), and tauernroggen.
- He also makes much use of green manure crops (like stinging nettle, phacelia, yellow, white and narrow-leaved lupin, garden pea, grass pea, fodder & Kidney vetch, yellow, subterranean, Crimson, Persian, Egyptian, red & white sweet clover, Birdsfoot trefoil, lucerne, black medick, Sainfoin, serradella, fiddleneck, sunflowers, Jerusalem artichoke, Gold-of-pleasure, etc...) and grows these crops extensively on his farm. He leaves them standing in autumn, rather than digging them in. He instead relies on natural decay of the plants. He often relies on the natural spreading of the seeds of the crops for their re-sowing.
- Another aspect is the abandonment of other horticultural principles such as intercropping plants with very high and very low pH requirements (for example, Rhododendron with roses). Instead, Holzer mixes thirty or more different types of seeds in a bucket and tosses the mix onto a larger area.

== The Krameterhof ==
Situated in Ramingstein on the slopes of Mount Schwarzenberg his farm (Krameterhof) lies at varying elevations ranging from 1100 to 1500 metres above sea level.

The exceptionally harsh climatic conditions in the area are generally considered inappropriate for farming. Nevertheless, he has managed to cultivate a variety of crops and even exotic plants like Kiwis and Sweet Chestnut.

The Krameterhof is less an operational enterprise, in terms of crop-yield (although it does provide numerous sorts of produce for the community), and more a fully functional showcase or research station for permaculture.

Endangered livestock species and rare alpine and cultural plant species are integrated into the farm.

== Publications translated into English ==
Most of Holzer's books are published in German through Leopold Stocker Verlag, an Austrian publisher in Graz.

- "The Rebel Farmer"
- "Sepp Holzer's Permaculture"
