= Fruit tree forms =

Shapes of fruit tree

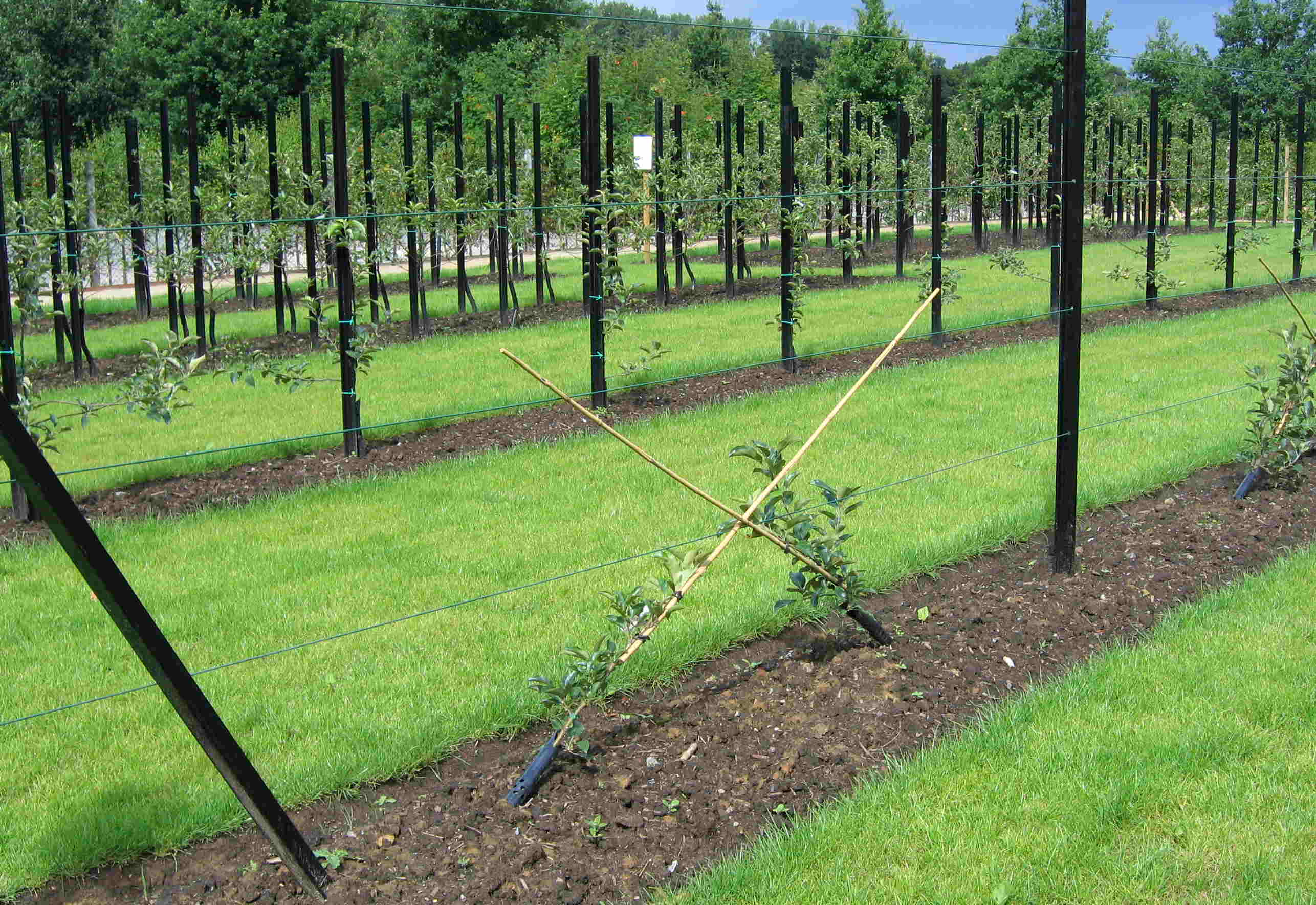
A test site with several fruit tree forms located at Gaasbeek Castle

Fruit trees are grown in a variety of shapes, sometimes for aesthetic appeal but mainly to encourage fruit production. The form or shape of fruit trees can be manipulated by pruning and training. Shaping and promoting a particular tree form is undertaken to establish the plant in a particular situation under certain environmental conditions, to increase fruit yield, and to enhance fruit quality. For example, pruning a tree to a pyramid shape enables trees to be planted closer together. An open bowl or cup form helps sunlight penetrate the canopy, thus encouraging a high fruit yield whilst keeping the tree short and accessible for harvesting. Other shapes such as cordons, espaliers and fans provide opportunities for growing trees two dimensionally against walls or fences, or they can be trained to function as barriers.

== Forms ==
Fruit tree shapes

Some of the following fruit tree forms require training by tying the branches to the required form. Most also require pruning to retain the desired structure. However, not all types of fruit tree are suitable for all forms; apples and pears do well as cordons and espaliers, for example, whereas cherries are better suited to the fan form.

=== Bush ===
An open-centred crown on a short trunk of less than 1 metre (3 ft 3 in). This is a traditional and popular form for apple trees. Bush trees are easy to maintain and bear fruit at a young age. Final height is between 2 metres (6 ft 7 in) and 5.5 metres (18 ft), depending on which rootstock is used.

=== Standard ===
Larger than the bush form, with trunks of 2 metres (6 ft 7 in) or more. Standard trees can reach a total height of 8 metres (26 ft). They eventually produce high yields but, being large trees, are not easy to maintain.

=== Pyramid ===
Similar to the bush form, although the main leader shoot is allowed to maintain its dominance, resulting in a pyramidal shape.

=== Spindlebush ===
A variant of the pyramid form in which the lateral branches are tied down to a horizontal position. Designed for dense orchards by Otto Schmitz-Hübsch and Heinrichs in Germany in 1936, this is currently the most popular training system for dwarf apple and pear trees.

=== Cordon ===
Single-stemmed trees planted at an angle (usually 45°), with fruiting spurs encouraged to form along the stem. Any side branches are removed by pruning. Cordons take less space and crop earlier than most other forms, so more varieties can be grown in a given space, but yields are smaller per tree. A special cordon set-up is the Bouché-Thomas system.

=== Espalier ===
A central vertical trunk with three or four horizontal branches on each side. A special espalier in this group is the LePage-system.

=== Fan ===
A short central trunk with several radiating branches growing from the crown.

=== Step-over espalier ===
Espaliers with just one tier of horizontal branches 30 cm (12 in) above the ground. These make a novel and productive border for a vegetable plot.

A study on orchard mango trees in Nelspruit, South Africa, compared the open vase, closed vase, central leader, palmette and standard pruning systems and recommended a modified pyramid, somewhere between a central leader and a closed vase system, for high-density mango orchards. The study also evaluated both post-fruit-set and post-harvest pruning, indicating that late mango cultivars benefit from pruning while bearing fruit in late fall, while early cultivars may be best pruned immediately after harvest.

== Yield and spacing ==
Apples and pears	Yield		Spacing	
Apples and pears	Apples	Pears	In rows	Rows apart
Bush	25–50 kg	20–45 kg	4–5 m	4–5 m
Dwarf bush	15–25 kg	10–20 kg	2.5–5 m	2.5–5 m
Dwarf pyramid	5–7 kg	3–5 kg	1.5–2 m	2 m
Espalier (two tier)	10–12 kg	7–10 kg	3–6 m	2 m
Fan	5–15 kg	5–15 kg	4–5 m	-
Single cordon	2–4 kg	2–3 kg	0.5–1 m	2 m
Standard	50–200 kg	40–100 kg	6–10 m	6–10 m

Other tree fruits	Yield	Spacing	
Other tree fruits	Yield	In rows	Rows apart
Bush (sour cherry)	15–20 kg	4–5 m	4–5 m
Bush (plum and peach)	15–30 kg	4–5 m	4–5 m
Bush, standard (sweet cherry)	15–50 kg	5–12 m	5–12 m
Fan (all stone fruits)	7–15 kg	4–5 m	-
Fan (sweet cherry)	6–15 kg	5–7.5 m	-
Pyramid (plum)	15–25 kg	3–4 m	3–4 m
Standard (plum, peach and apricot)	15–50 kg	5–7.5 m	5–7.5 m

== Images ==
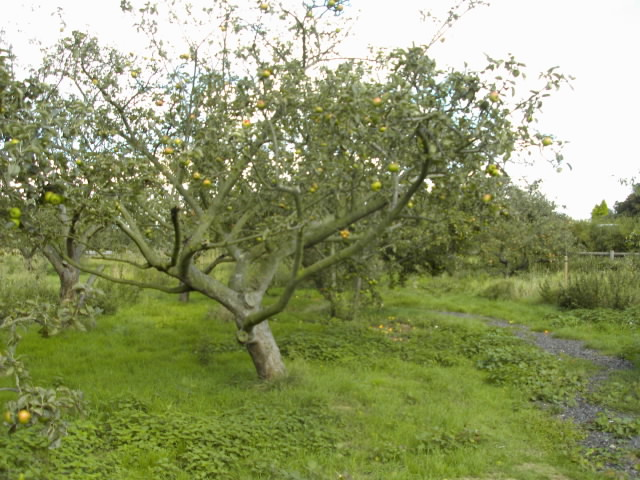
A community apple orchard originally planted for productive use

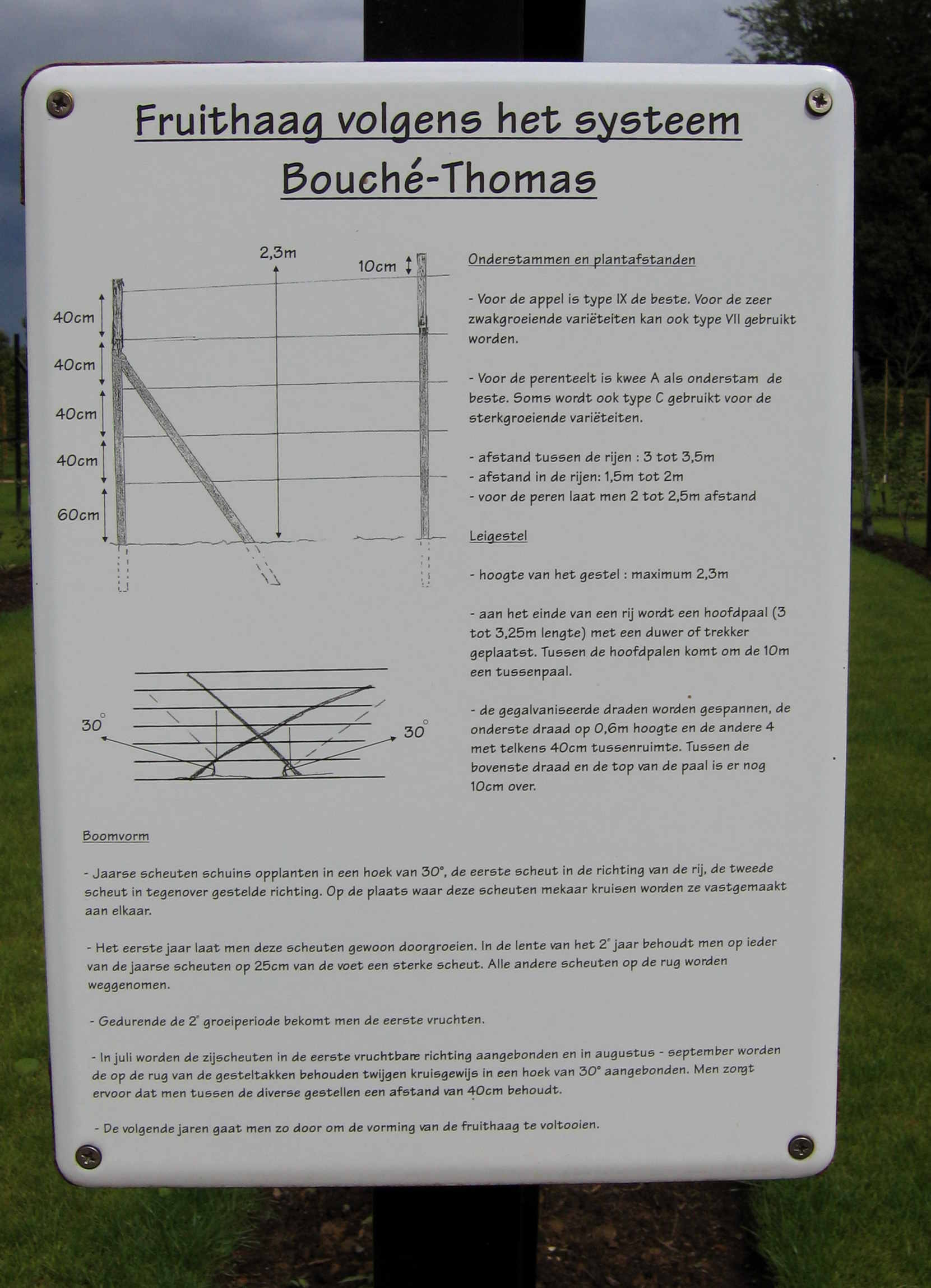
Description of the Bouché-Thomas fruit tree form

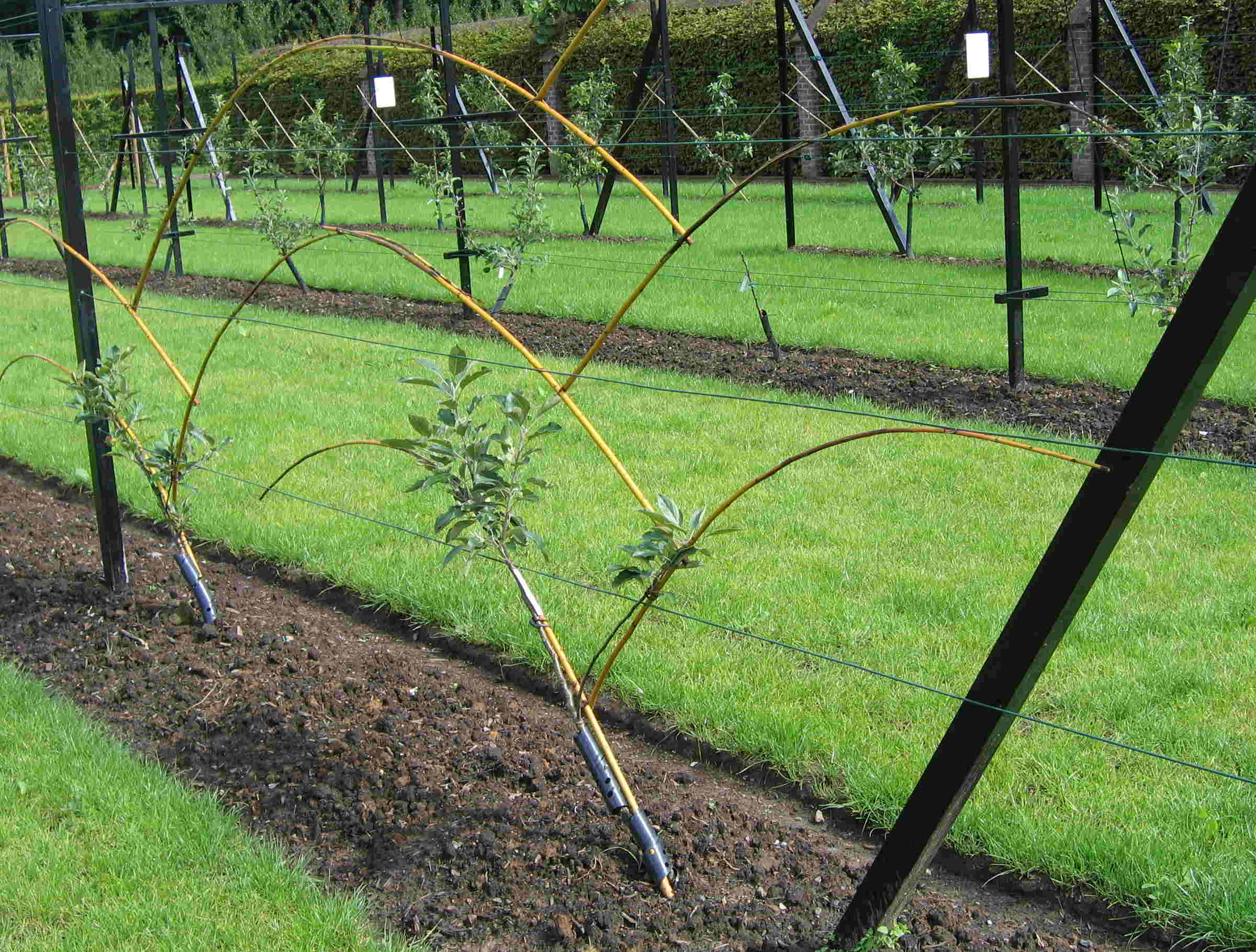
Photo of the LePage fruit tree form

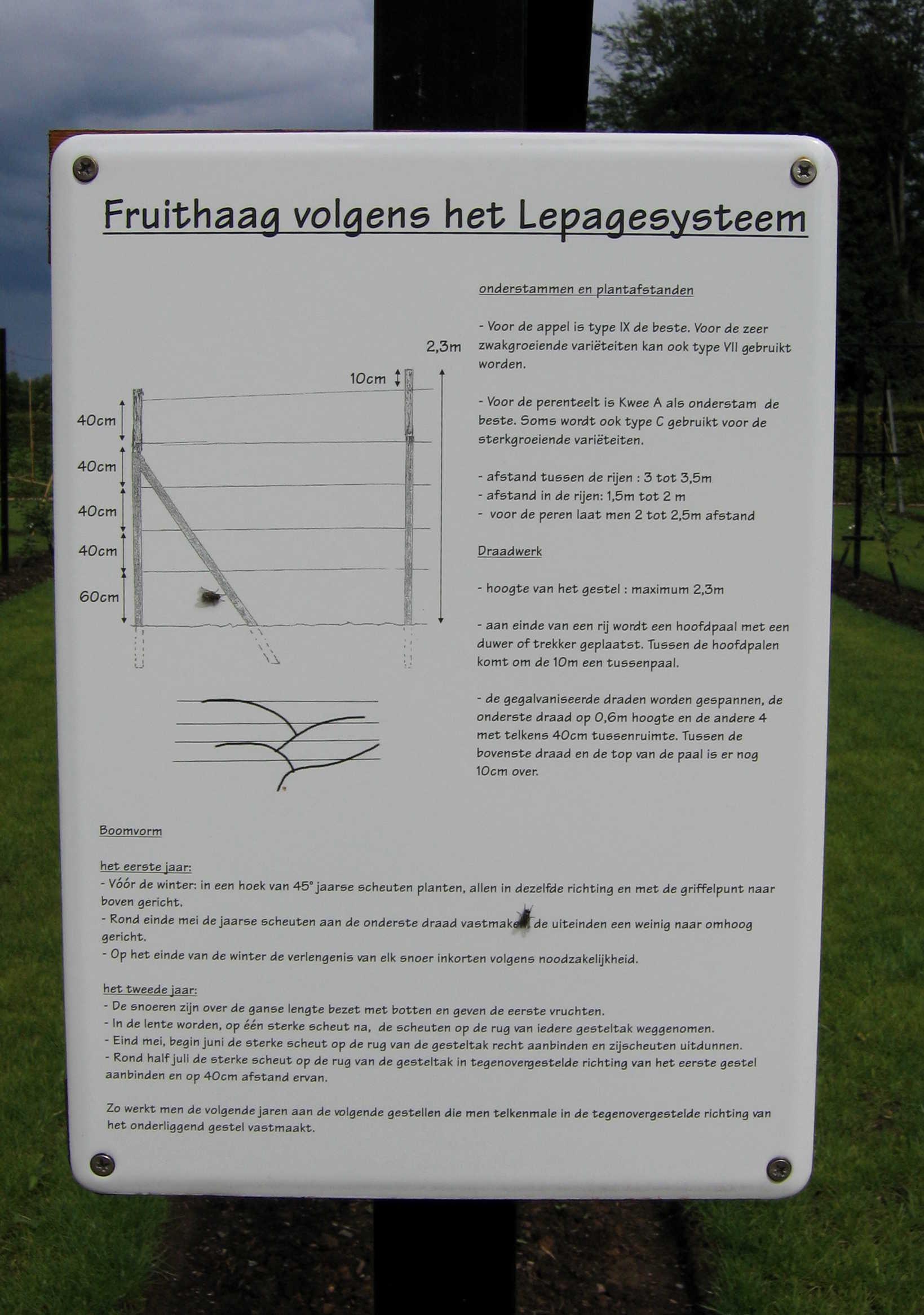
Description of LePage fruit tree form

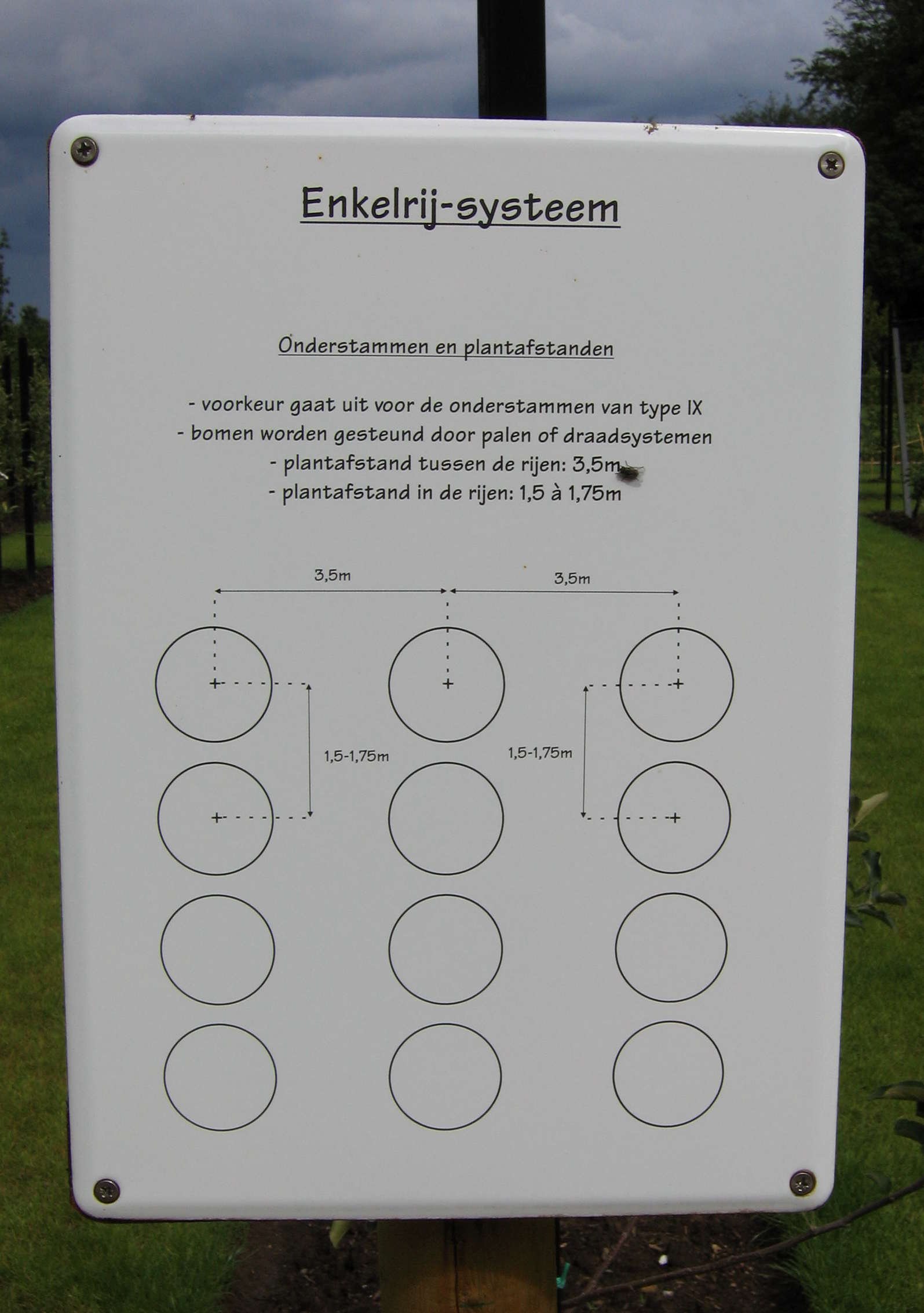
Description of the single row fruit tree form setup

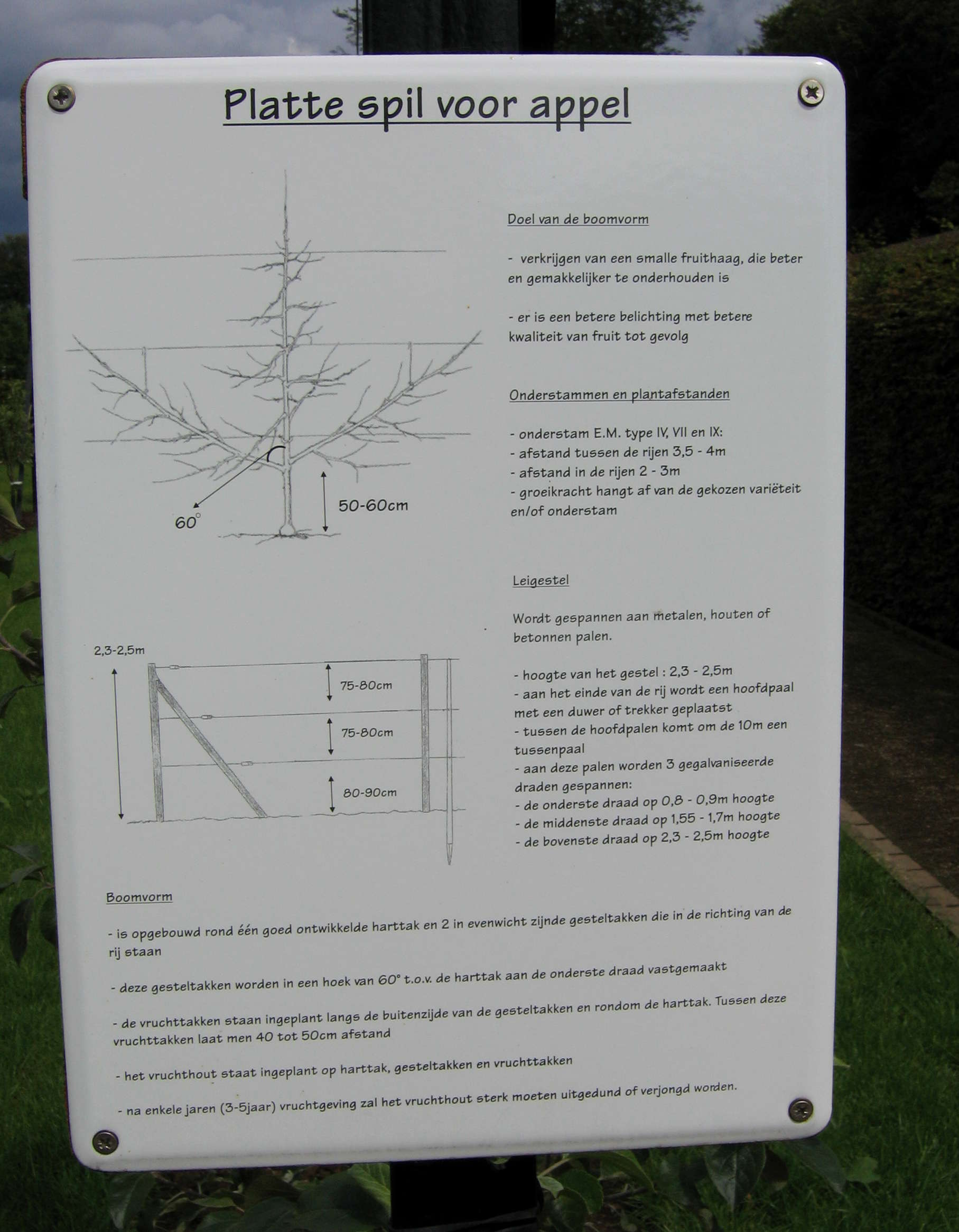
Description of the spindlebush fruit tree form

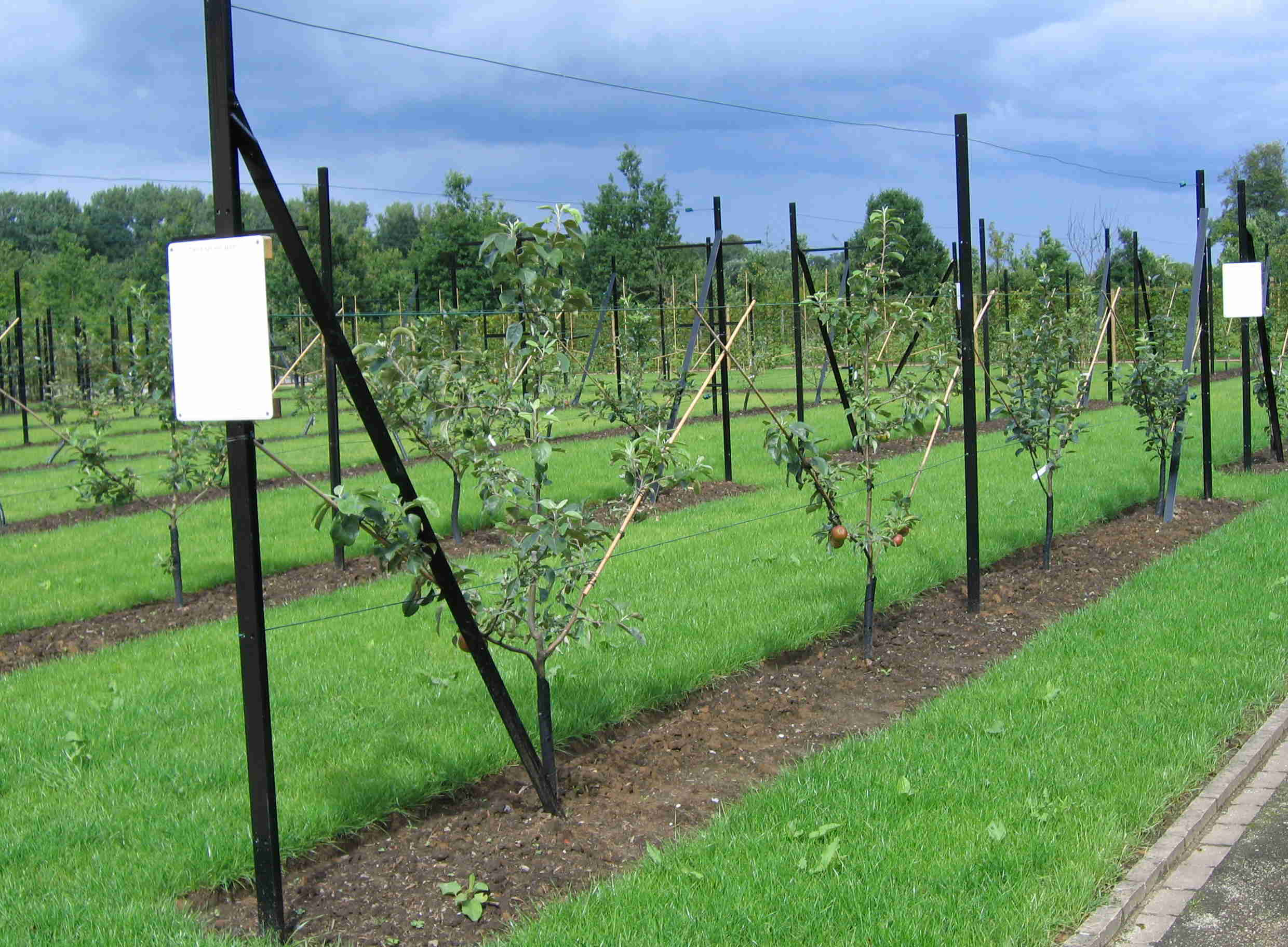
Photo of the spindlebush fruit tree form

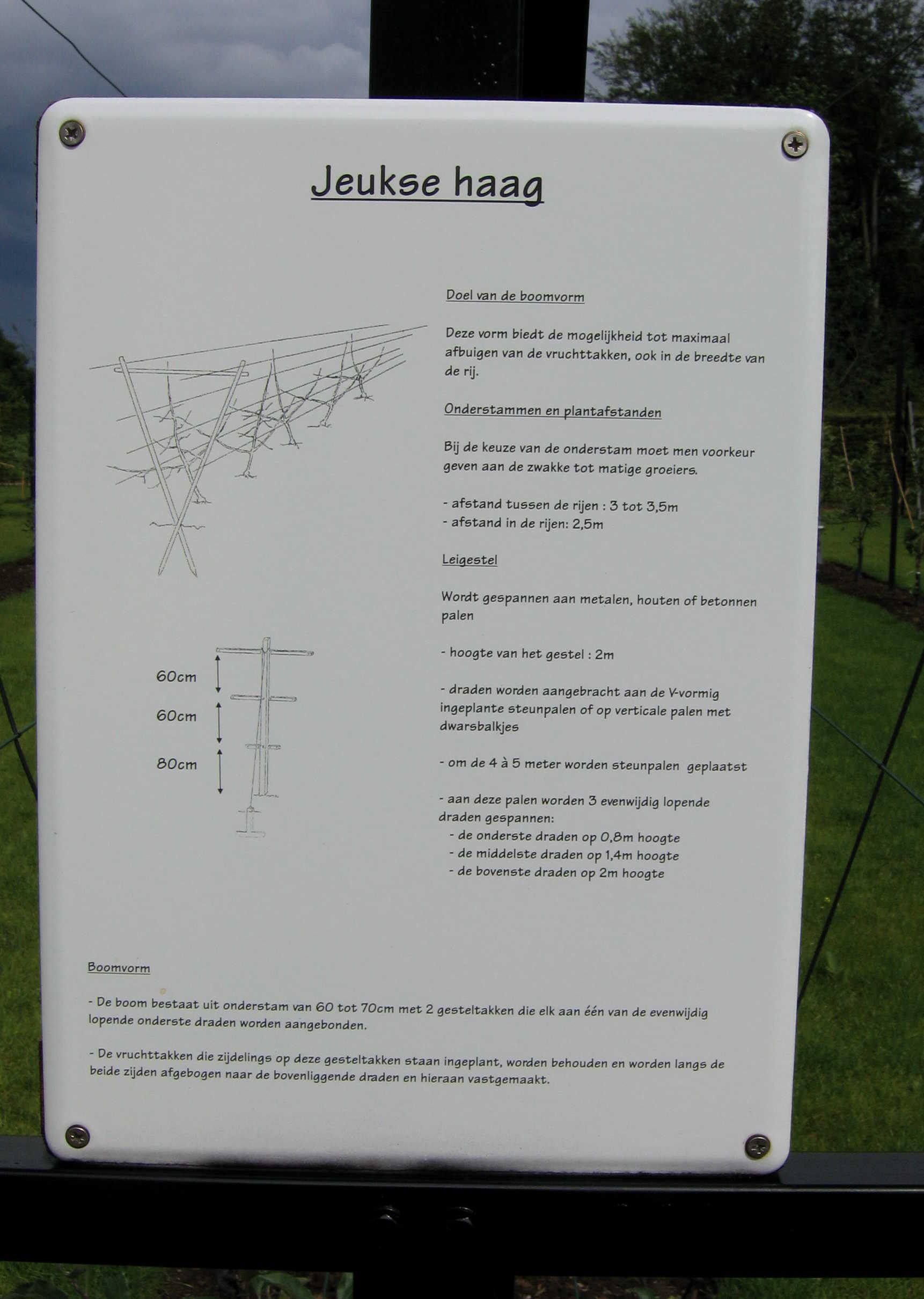
Description of the "Jeukse Haag" fruit tree form

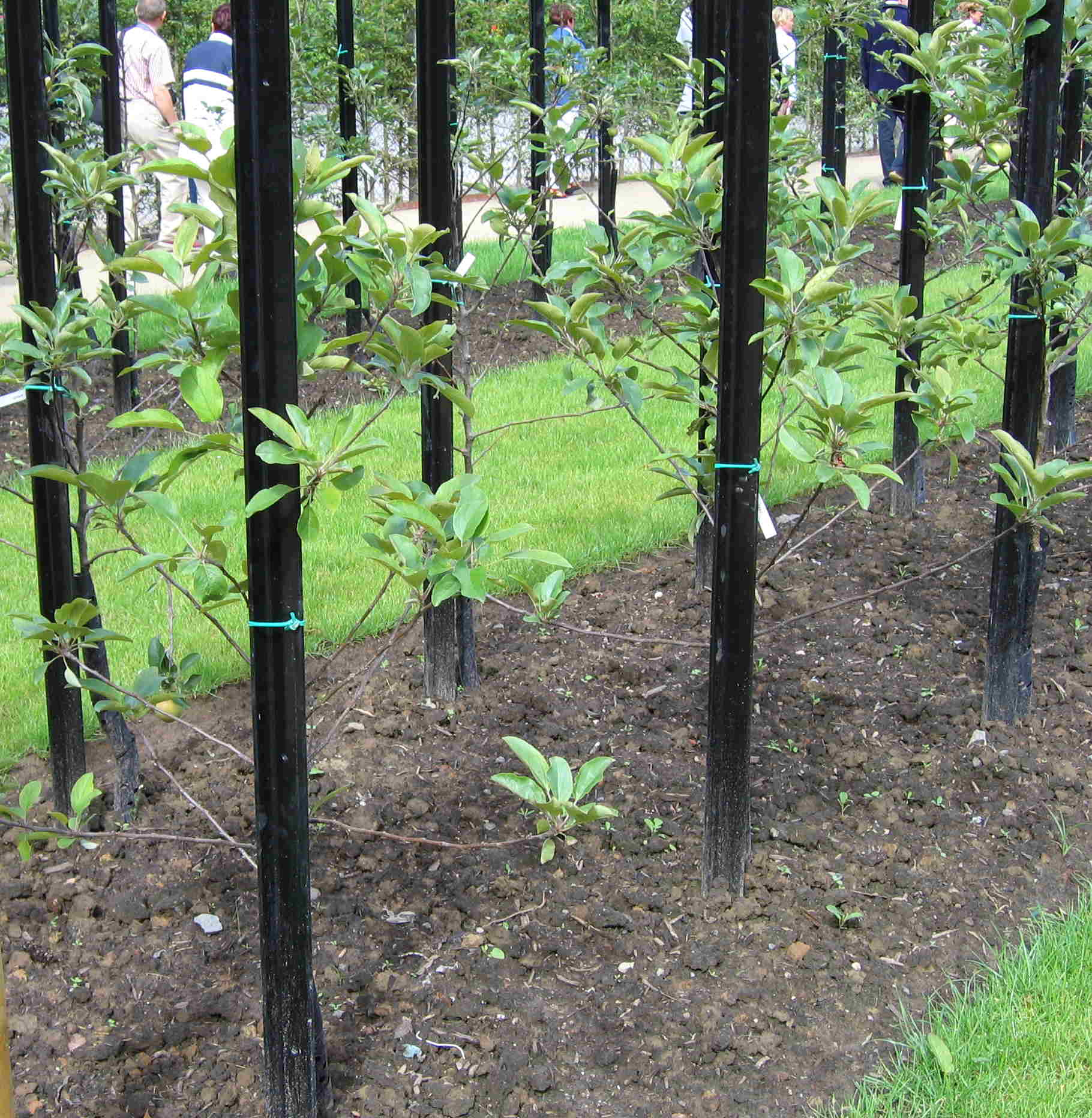
Photo of the standard fruit tree form

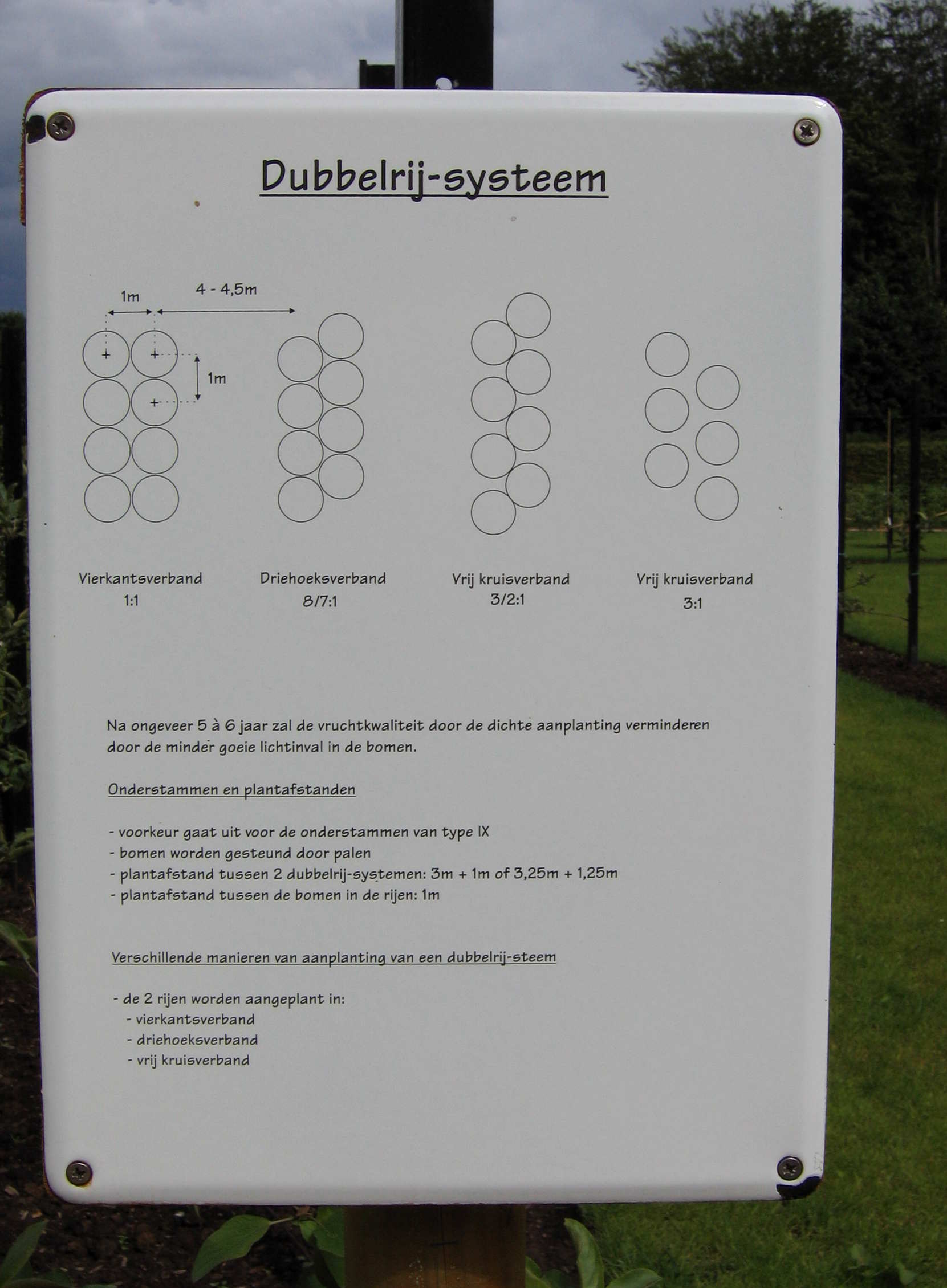
Description of the double row fruit tree form setup

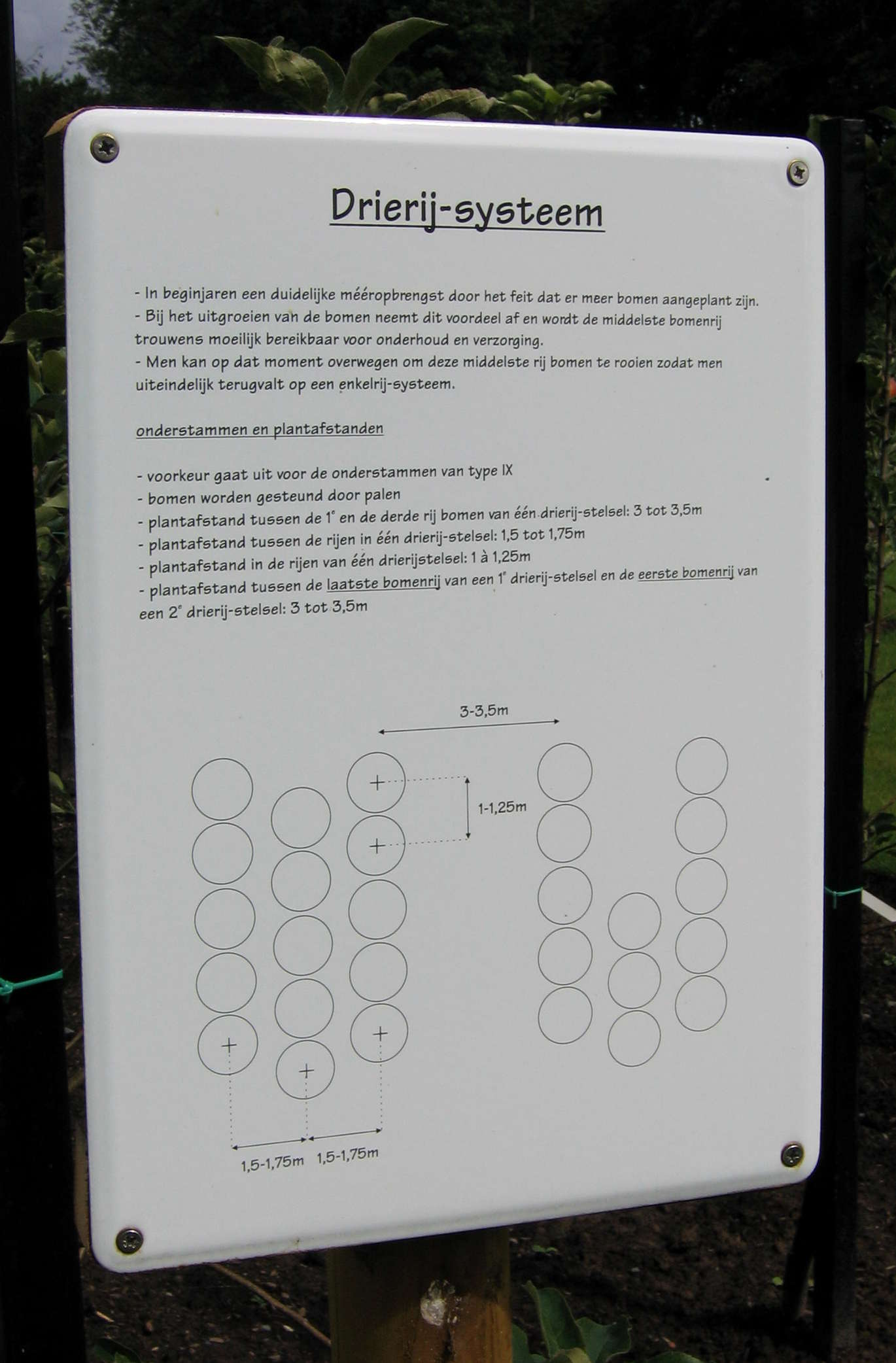
Description of the triple row fruit tree form setup

== See also ==
- Fruit tree pollination
- Fruit tree propagation
- Orchards
- Pruning fruit trees
- Tree shaping

== Books and publications ==
- Burvenich, Frederik (1879). Snoei der Fruitbomen.
