= Fruit tree =

Tree which bears fruit

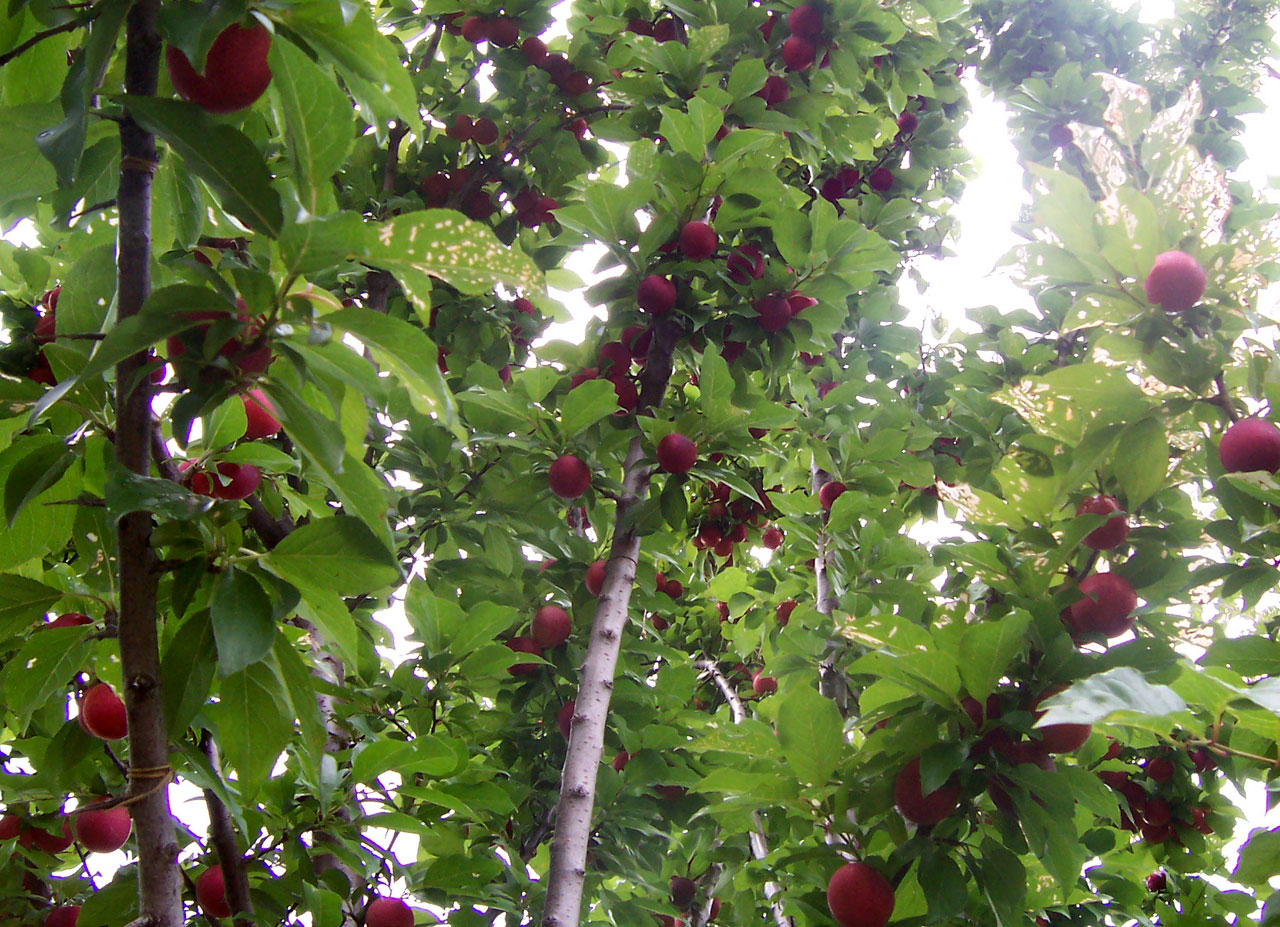
A plum tree with developing fruit

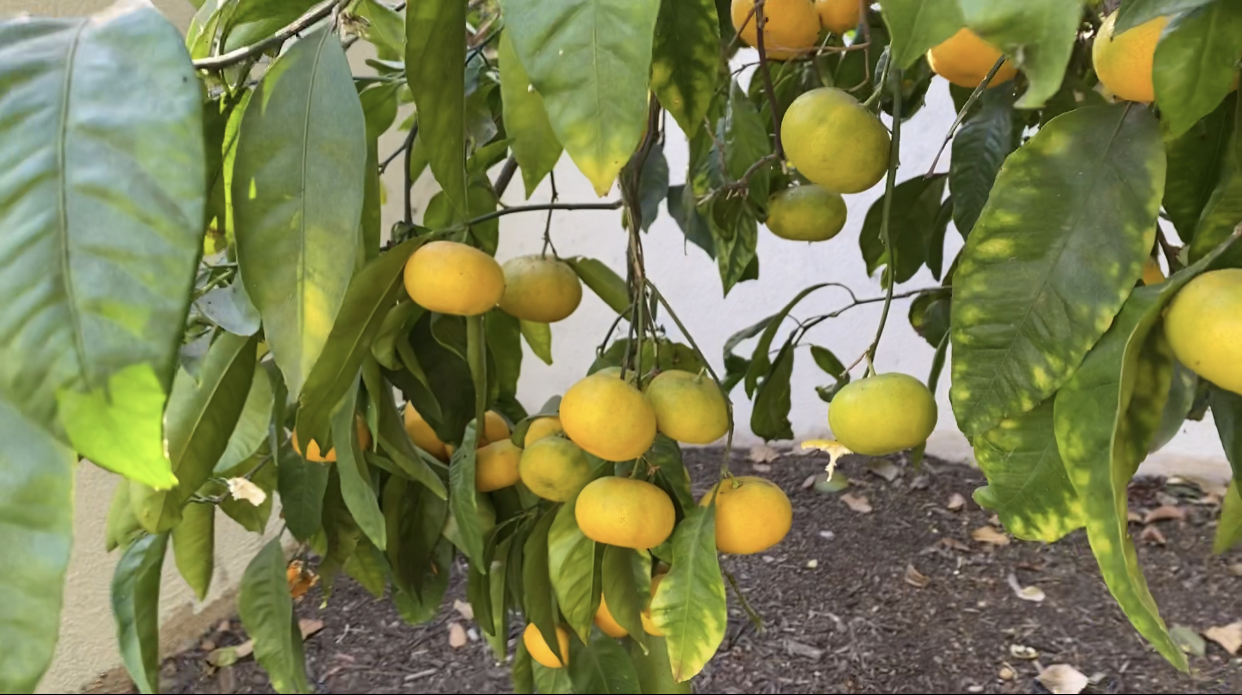
Mandarin Orange tree with fruit

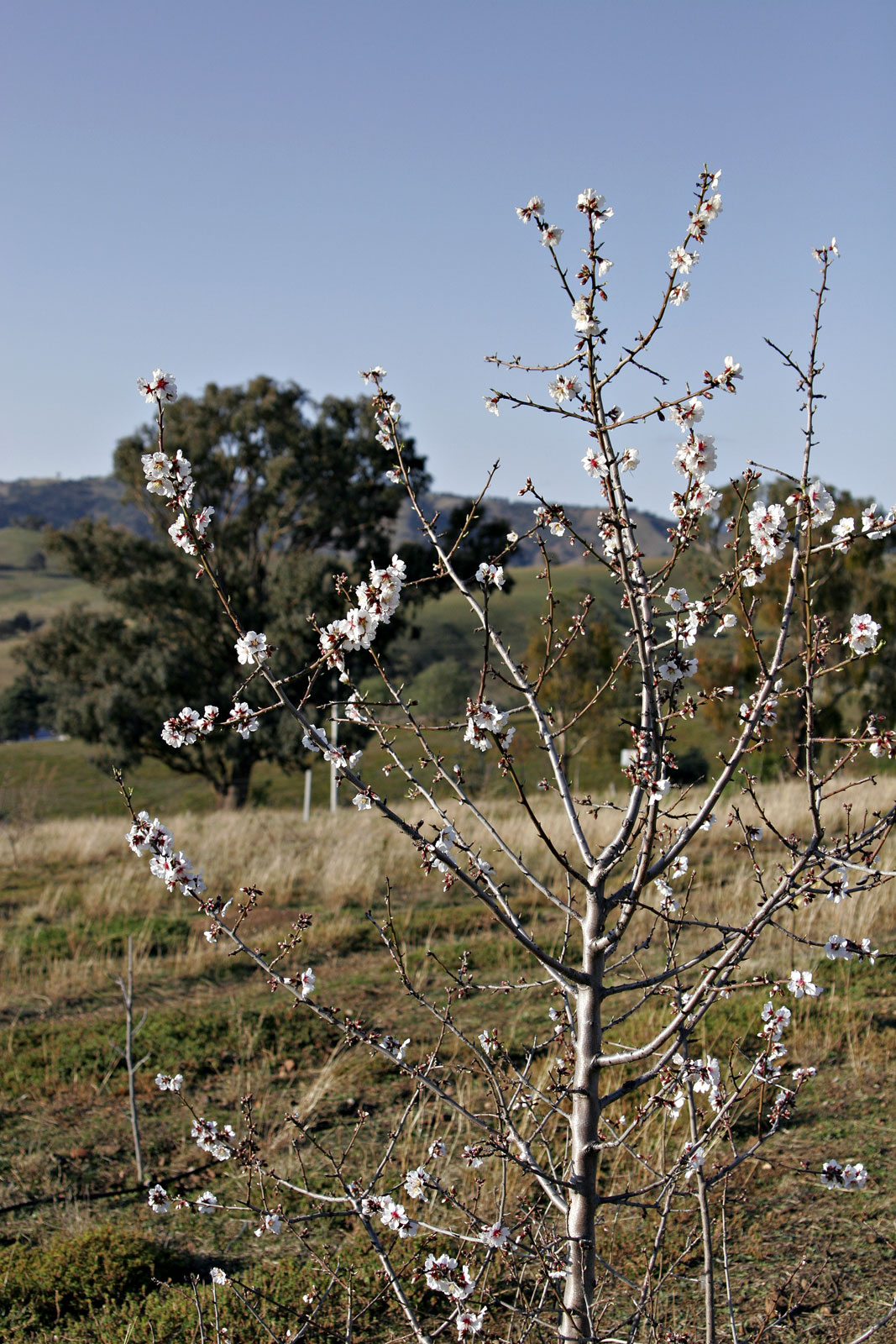
An almond tree in bloom

A fruit tree is a tree which bears fruit that is consumed or used by animals and humans. All trees that are flowering plants produce fruit, which are the ripened ovaries of flowers containing one or more seeds. In horticultural usage, the term "fruit tree" is limited to those that provide fruit for human food. Types of fruits are described and defined elsewhere (see Fruit), but would include "fruit" in a culinary sense, as well as some nut-bearing trees, such as walnuts.

Pomology is the scientific study and cultivation of fruit, which divides fruits into groups based on plant morphology and anatomy. Some of those groups are pome fruits, which include apples and pears, and stone fruits, which include peaches/nectarines, almonds, apricots, plums and cherries.

== Examples ==
- Abiu
- Almond
- Amla (Indian gooseberry)
- Apple
- Apricot
- Avocado
- Bael
- Ber (Indian plum)
- Carambola (starfruit)
- Cashew
- Cherry
- Citrus (orange, lemon, lime, etc.)
- Coconut
- Crab apple
- Damson
- Durian
- dragon fruit
- Elderberry
- Fig
- Grapefruit
- Guava
- Jackfruit
- Jujube
- Lemon
- Lime
- Loquat
- Lychee
- Mango
- Medlar
- Morello cherry
- Mulberry
- Olive
- Pawpaw, both the tropical Carica papaya and the North American Asimina triloba
- Peach and nectarine
- Pear
- Pecan
- Persimmon
- Pistachio
- Plum
- Pomelo
- Quince
- Pomegranate
- Rambutan
- Sapodilla
- Soursop
- Sugar-apple
- Sweet chestnut
- Tamarillo
- Ugli fruit
- Walnut
- Water Apple
- Orange

== See also ==
- Fruit tree forms
- Fruit tree pollination
- Fruit tree propagation
- List of fruits
- Multipurpose tree
- Orchard
- Pruning fruit trees
- Drupe
