= Hügelkultur =

Mounded gardening technique

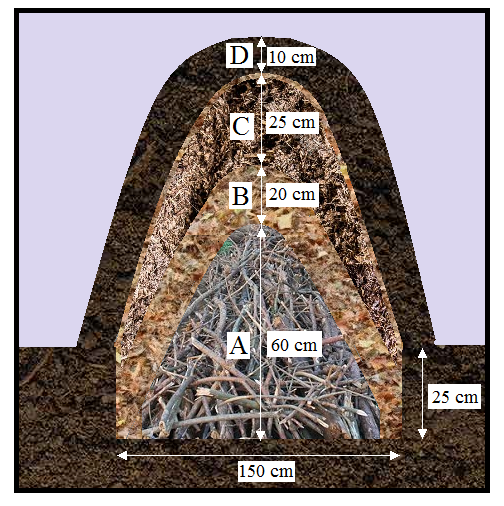
A schematic image of a Hügelkultur mound. A Wood with soil B Leaves (possibly turf) C Compost D Garden soil (Not shown is the top layer of mulch to protect against erosion and drying out.)

Hügelkultur (German pronunciation: [ˈhyːɡl̩kʊlˌtuːɐ̯], alternative spelling without umlaut: Huegelkultur), literally mound culture or hill culture, is a horticultural technique where a mound constructed from decaying wood debris and other compostable biomass plant materials is later (or immediately) planted as a raised bed. Considered a permaculture practice, advocates claim that the technique helps to improve soil fertility, water retention, and soil warming, thus benefitting plants grown on or near such mounds.

== History ==
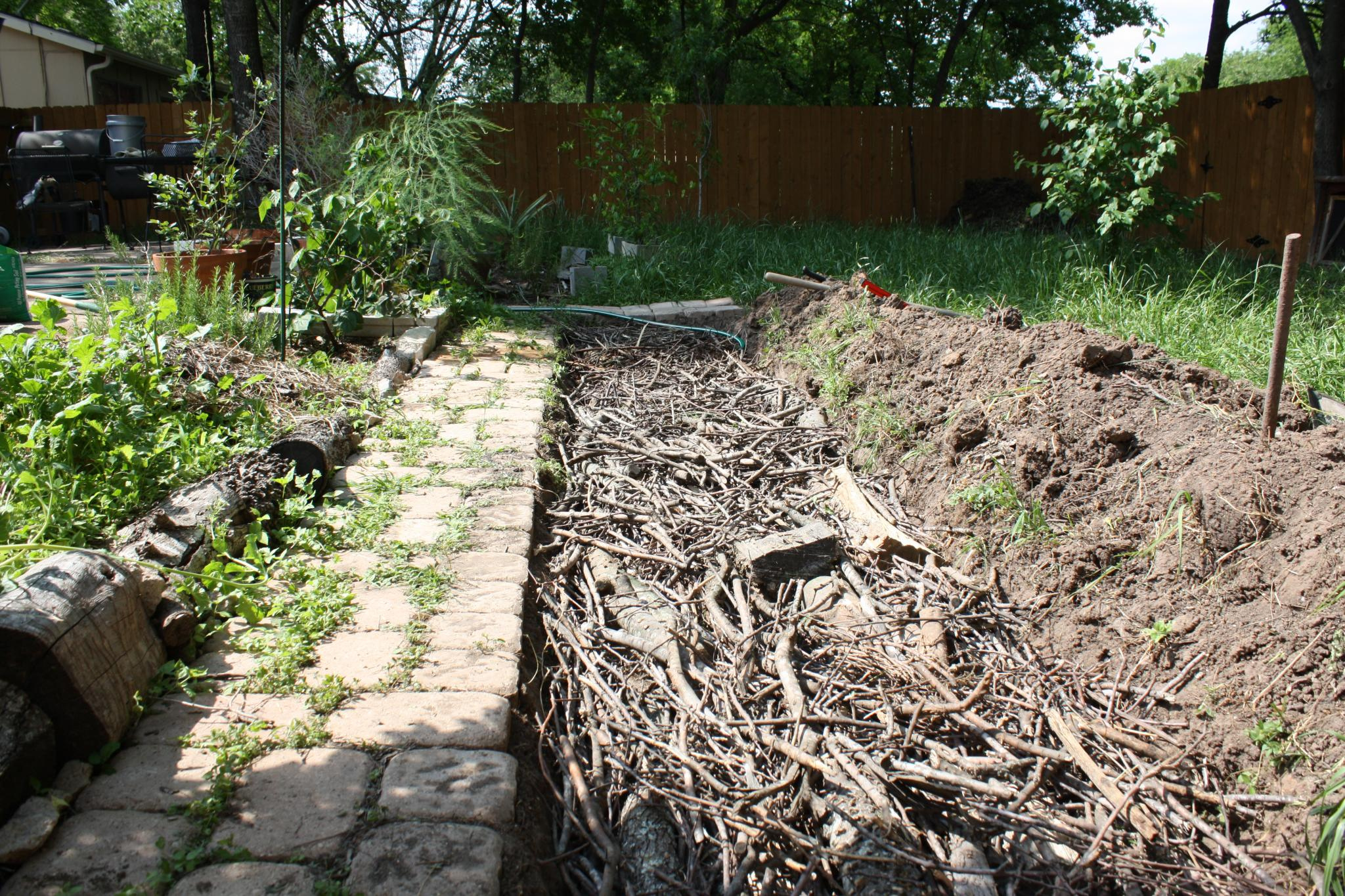
Hügelkultur bed prior to being covered with soil

Hügelkultur is a German word meaning mound culture or hill culture. Though the technique is alleged to have been practiced in German and Eastern European societies for hundreds of years, the term was first published in a 1962 German gardening booklet by Herrman Andrä. Inspired by the diversity of plants growing in a pile of woody debris in his grandmother's garden, Andrä promoted "mound culture" as opposed to "flatland culture". This was also posited as an easy way to utilise woody debris without burning, which was illegal. Andrä appears to have been influenced by Rudolf Steiner's biodynamic agriculture. Steiner explained his biodynamic philosophy as developed through meditation and clairvoyance, on the grounds that his methods were “true and correct unto themselves.” Andrä quotes a 1924 lecture on biodynamics by Steiner, which describes mixing of soil with composting or decaying material in earthen hillocks. Joined by author Hans Beba, another German gardener, "Hill Culture - the horticultural method of the future" was revised and republished several times in the 1970s and 1980s.

The technique was later adopted and developed by Sepp Holzer, an Austrian permaculture advocate. More recent permaculture advocates such as Paul Wheaton strongly promote Hügelkultur beds as a perfect permaculture design.

== Use ==
=== Construction ===
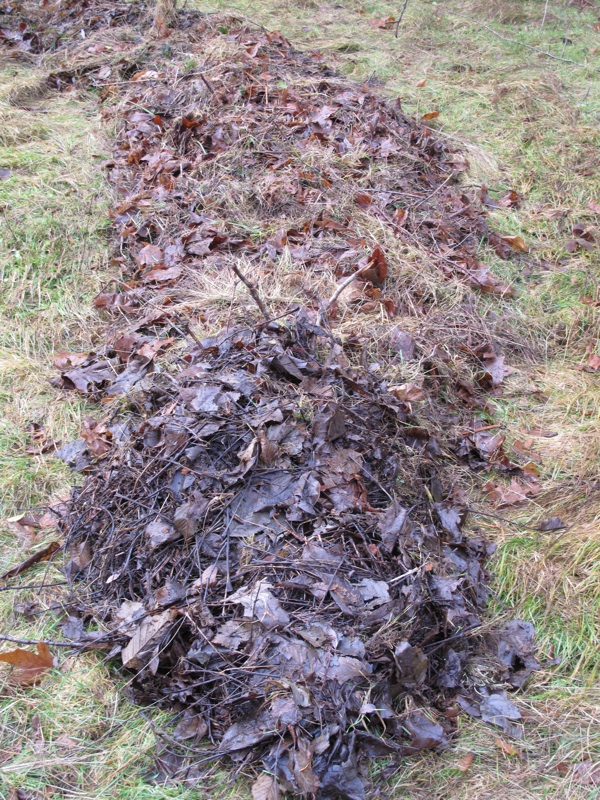
Hügelkultur bed construction, shown without the top layer of soil

In its basic form, mounds are constructed by piling logs, branches, plant waste, compost and additional soil directly on the ground. The pile has the form of a pyramid. (Note—Wheaton suggests piling the wood higgledy-piggledy rather than in a neat stack as shown, for structural engineering of the steep slope, or perpendicular to the spine of the mound.) The sides of the two slopes both have a grade of between 65 and 80 degrees. The beds are usually about 3 by 6 feet (0.91 by 1.83 m) in area and about 3 feet (0.91 m) high. However, this height reduces as decomposition progresses.

When positioned on sloped terrain, the beds need to be placed on contour or put at an angle to the hillside (rather than parallel to it). This makes sure the beds do not receive unequal amounts of water. In most cases, it is useful to have the beds positioned against the prevailing wind direction.

The raised bed can form light-duty swales, circles and mazes. Mounds may also be made from alternating layers of wood, sod, compost, straw, and soil. Although their construction is straightforward, planning is necessary to prevent steep slopes that would result in erosion.

In his book Desert or Paradise: Restoring Endangered Landscapes Using Water Management, Including Lake and Pond Construction, Holzer describes a method of constructing Hügelkultur which incorporates rubbish such as cardboard, clothes and kitchen waste. He recommends building mounds that are 1 meter (3.3 ft) wide and any length. Mounds are built in a 0.7 meters (2.3 ft) trench in sandy soil, and without a trench if the ground is wet.

=== Planting ===
The mound is left to rest for several months before planting, although some advise immediate planting.

Anything can be grown on the raised beds, but if the bed will decompose/release its nutrients quickly (so long as it is not made of bulky materials like tree trunks), more demanding crops such as pumpkins, zucchini, cucumbers, cabbages, tomatoes, sweet corn, celery, or potatoes are grown in the first year, after which the bed is used for less demanding crops like beans, peas, and strawberries.

=== Lifespan ===
The original German publications described the mounds as having a lifespan of 5–6 years, after which they had to be rebuilt from scratch.

== Evidence ==
There are few peer-reviewed scientific studies available regarding the efficacy of the technique. A few university student projects have investigated Hügelkultur, but those results have not made it into the peer-reviewed literature.

One small scale and short term student project investigated the Hügelkultur method as a potential use for yard trimmings waste, and also if lima beans, kale and okra planted on a Hügelkultur mound showed any signs of nutrient deficiency compared to a non-raised control bed. It was found that over 11 tons of yard trimmings were used in the mound, and no evidence of macronutrient deficiency could be detected in the crops in the short term. Indeed, despite concerns that incorporation of large quantities of high carbon woody matter would lead to nitrogen immobilization and hence nitrogen deficiency in the crop, a higher level of nitrogen was found in the raised bed. However, the micronutrient iron was lower relative to the control bed. The author speculated that no nitrogen deficiency occurred since the roots of the plants did not penetrate past the superficial layers of the mound into the deeper wood-containing region.

A student thesis investigated the water holding capacity of Hügelkultur beds and whether the technique could be useful to prevent karst rocky desertification in China. Over 3 months of measurements, water concentration in hügel mounds remained high. Samples from hügel sites contained almost twice as much water as those from flat control plots. It was suggested that 1 ha (2 1/2 acres) of hügels has 3-10 times more water than a flat plot affected by karst rocky desertification.

A 2024 study comparing different permaculture approaches found increased carbon content in soils treated with Hügelkultur, and reduce waterlogging. Combined with prior results regarding the improvement of water holding capacity in China, these results suggest that Hügelkultur could be a valuable natural soil conditioner.

== Theory ==
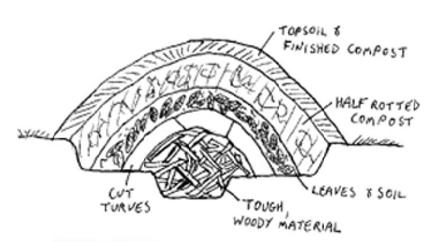
Layers of woody material and compost or soil used to build a Hügelkultur bed

Many publications and websites advocate the technique based on personal experience of the authors. Some have criticised the technique as lacking genuine scientific principles, and running counter to the ecological principles of soil building with litterfall.

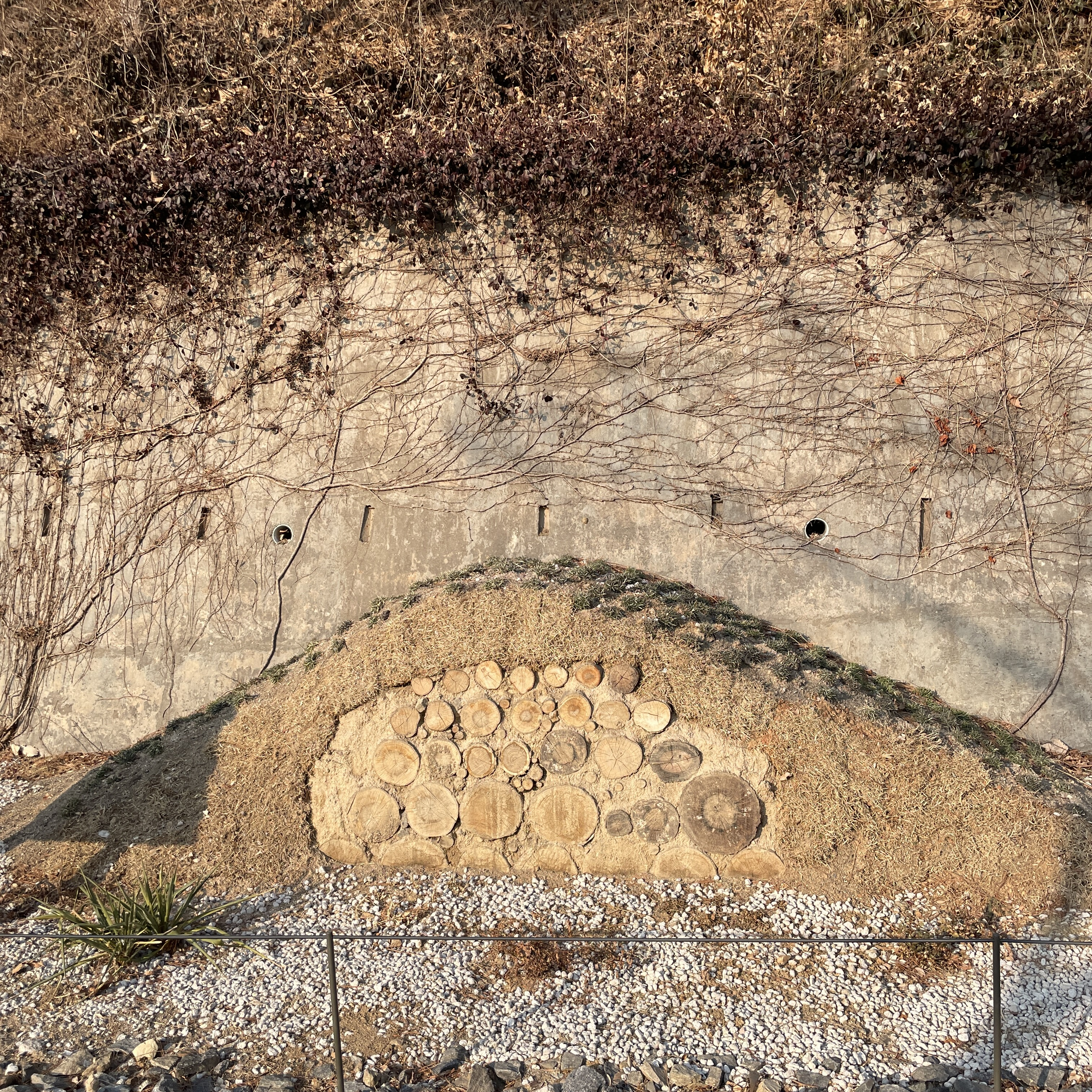
Hügelkultur in Seoul, South Korea

Hügelkultur is said to replicate the natural process of decomposition that occurs on forest floors, however in natural ecosystems wood would be present at the soil surface. Trees that fall in a forest often become nurse logs decaying and providing ecological facilitation to seedlings. As the wood decays, its porosity increases, allowing it to store water like a sponge. The water is slowly released back into the environment, benefiting nearby plants.

These beds are also considered beneficial because of the air pockets created by the settling caused by the wood's decomposition. This gives the benefits of tilling, without the destruction of soil microorganisms that come with tilling ("every time you till the soil, you lose 30% of the organic material (microbial soil life is killed, and plants feast on their bodies)"). And, the organic material of the rotting wood also houses beneficial soil microorganisms.

Hügelkultur beds are said to be ideal for areas where the underlying soil is of poor quality or compacted. They tend to be easier to maintain due to their relative height above the ground.

The decomposition speed of organic material depends on the carbon to nitrogen ratio of the material, among other factors. Wood breaks down relatively slowly because it has one of the highest carbon to nitrogen ratios of all organic matter that is used in composting. If the wood is not processed into smaller pieces with larger surface area to speed up chemical reactions, breakdown is even slower. The decomposition process may, in the short term, take more nitrogen from the soil through microbial activity (nitrogen immobilization), if not enough nitrogen is available. Thus, in the short term, the fertility of the soil may be decreased before, eventually, perhaps after one to two years, the nitrogen level is increased past the original level. Traditionally, therefore, it is said to be advantageous to balance "browns" (e.g. woodchippings) with "greens" (e.g. grass clippings) for efficient composting, and to allow compost to become well-rotted before applying it to a bed, to prevent competition between soil bacteria and plants for nitrogen, which reduces yield.

== Criticisms and controversy ==
=== Hügelkultur mounds as solid earthworks ===
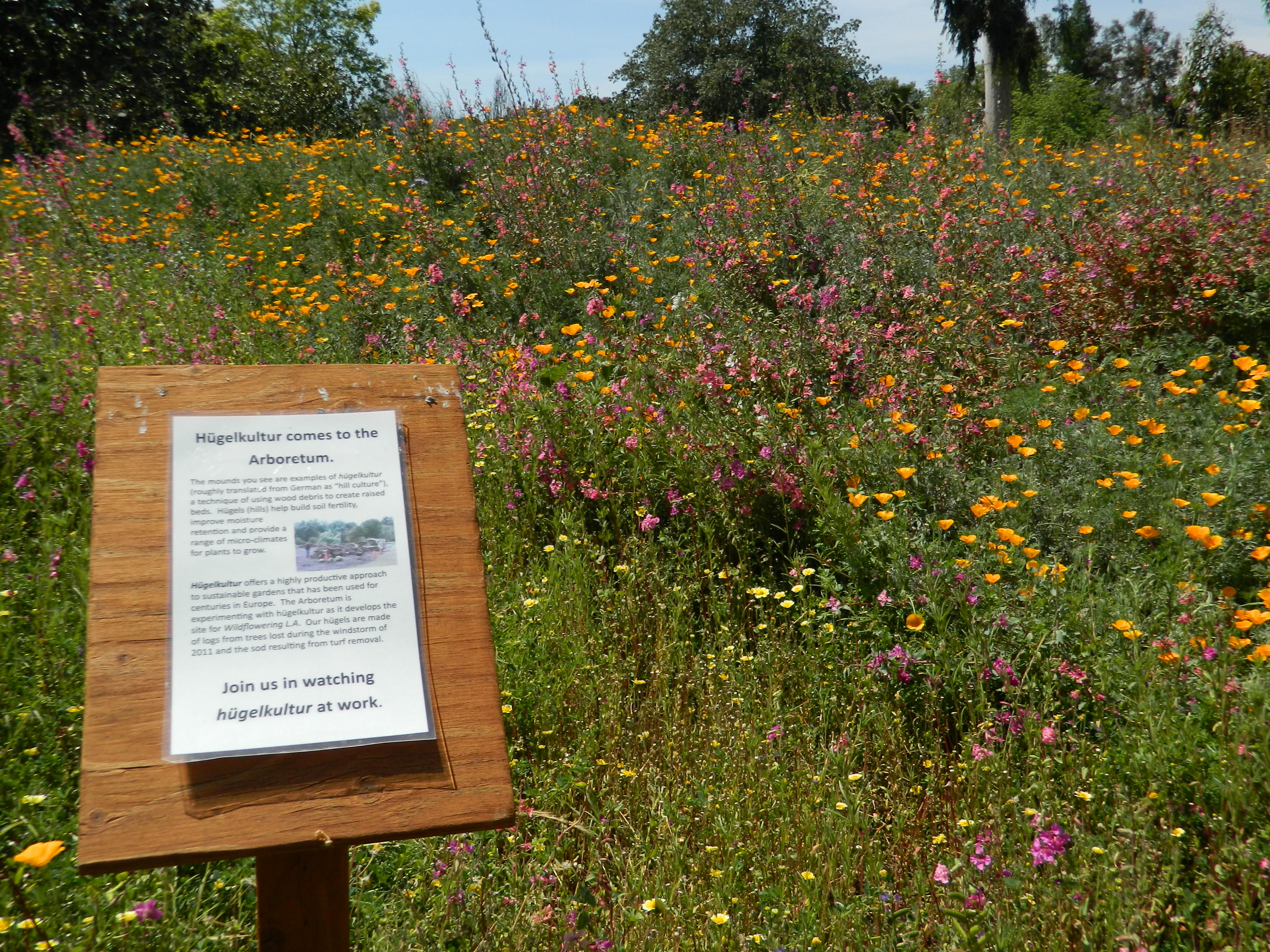
Hügelkultur bed with wildflower overplanting, Los Angeles County arboretum

Although Hügelkultur beds can safely retain water in light-duty applications (for example, conserving the moisture of rain that falls on the bed), creating heavy-duty rainwater retention areas behind Hügelkultur beds on contour, to catch surface runoff from surrounding areas, can be dangerous. Some designers conflate the Hügelkultur bed's appearance with that of solid earthworks, but Hügelkultur beds cannot predictably control large amounts of stormwater in the way that solid earthworks can. Whereas embankment dams or the hillsides of swales can be relied on to hold back many thousands of gallons of water for weeks to allow it to seep into the ground, and berms can slow runoff, Hügelkultur beds are different in two ways: earthworks are made of compacted soil (to improve strength) and have no buoyant core (whereas Hügelkultur mounds contain logs). If fresh or dried timber is used in the bed, it may become buoyant in the water-saturated substrate, bursting from the soil covering and releasing all the sitting water through a breach. This can be an issue for years, until the wood is sufficiently rotten and infused with water. Another consideration is that Hügelkultur beds will degrade, shrinking over time into much lower mounds of soft, rich soil. This means that the retention area will have less depth as time goes on, but it also means that the uncompacted soil will remain a threat to breaching even if the logs become saturated.

Some permaculturists have taken mild positions against the "hügel swales" still being promoted by other permaculturists, citing the danger and cross-purposes of Hügelkultur beds and swales. Swales are for long-term installations where perennials - like fruit trees - are grown. Hügelkultur is used for shorter term, more annual crops, as the soil settling that occurs with hugel decomposition is bad for the root system of fruit trees. A common practice is to plant fruit trees beside a hugelkultur mound where some nutrient runoff can feed the tree without the tree’s support collapsing under it, while also allowing the tree to extend its roots laterally under or upward into the hugelkultur mound as far as it “needs.”

There is a recorded instance of a breach occurring in a new project. Upon the first rainstorm, the retention areas behind the Hügelkultur beds filled with water and broke through. The released water carried the freshly-buried logs and dirt downhill, smashing a hole in a building being used as a church and filling the space with mud. No injuries were reported.

=== Overfertilization, contamination of soil and water habitats ===
Over-fertilized plants are said to have less flavor, and too much nitrogen can be consumed by eating certain plants which have been over-fertilised (e.g., spinach). Advocates state that overfertilization is a risk in the first year if woodchips are used, which will break down too fast. Instead raised beds made with whole logs release nutrients slowly over a period of years. It has been suggested that excessive use of decomposing organic matter in Hügelkultur could leach out and contaminate and disrupt soil and water habitats.

== See also ==
- Hotbed
- Hot container composting
- Vertical farming
- Zaï, similar African technique
