= Espalier =

Pruning/tying branches to flat structure

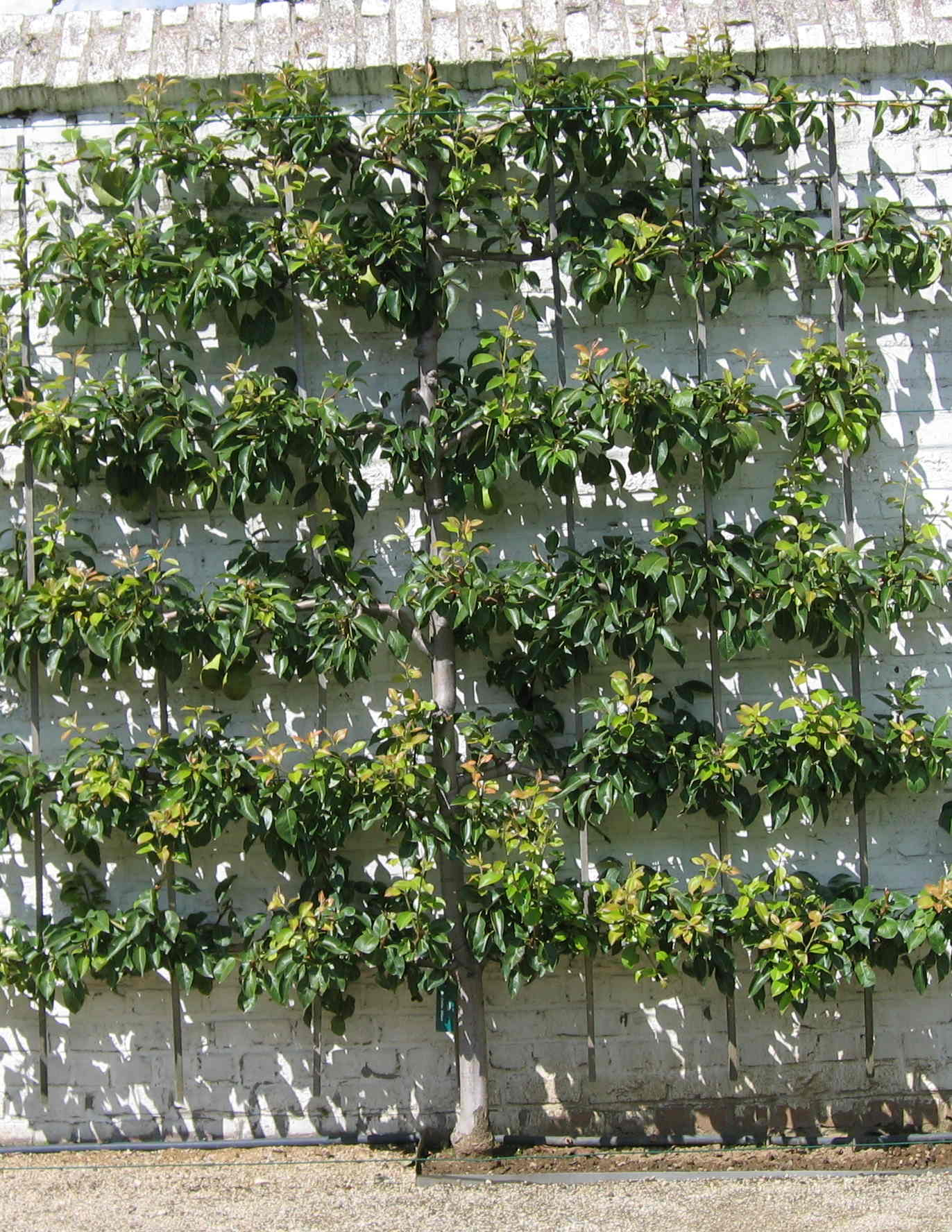
A horizontal espalier

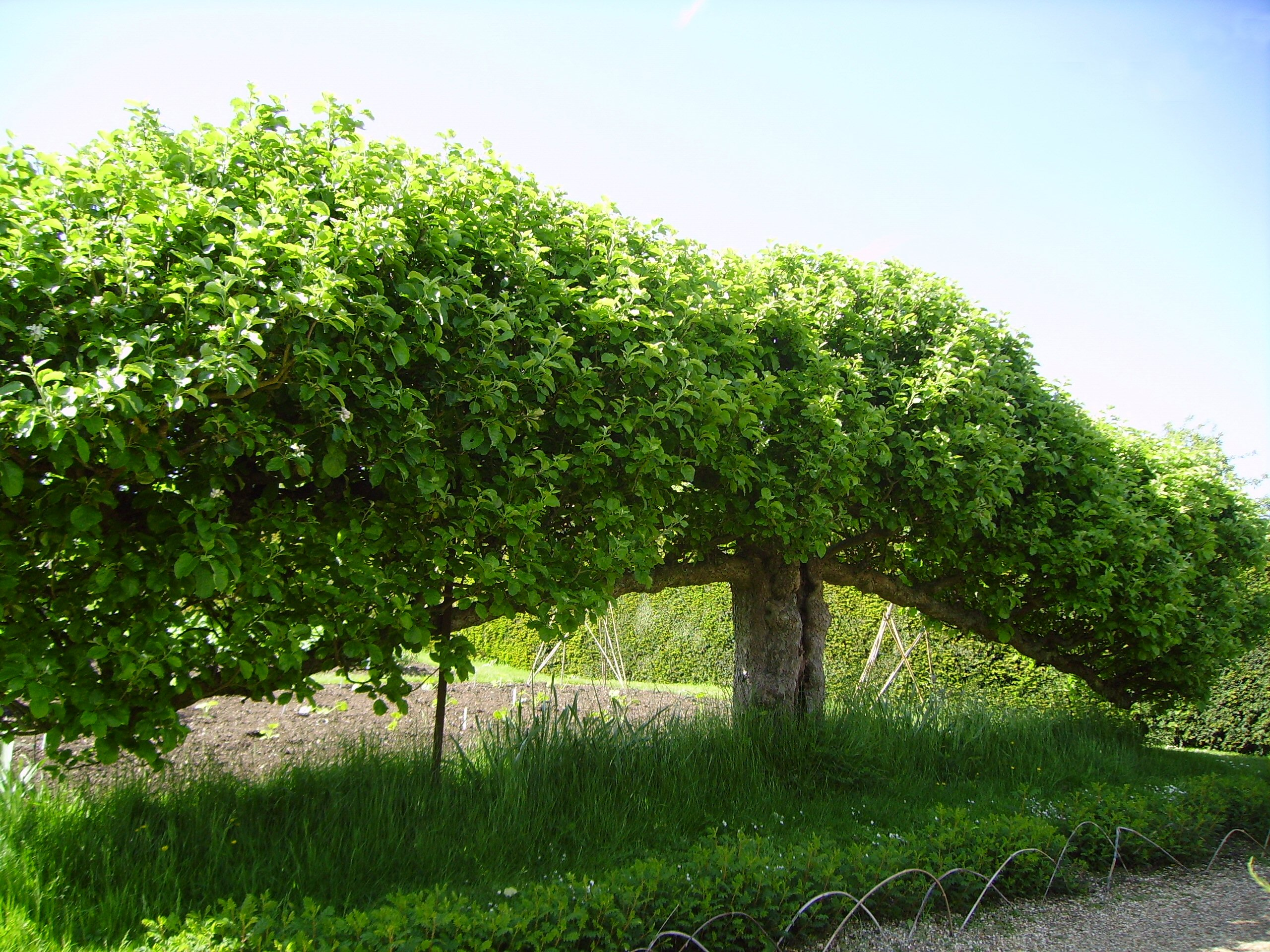
Free-standing espaliered fruit trees (step-over) at Standen, West Sussex. The trees are used to create a fruit border or low hedge.

Espalier (/ɪˈspælɪər/ or /ɪˈspæli.eɪ/) is the horticultural and ancient agricultural practice of controlling woody plant growth for the production of fruit, by pruning and tying branches to a frame. Plants are frequently shaped in formal patterns, flat against a structure such as a wall, fence, or trellis. The term is also used to refer to plants which have been shaped in this way.

Espaliers, trained into flat two-dimensional forms, are used not only for decorative purposes, but also for gardens in which space is limited. In a temperate climate, espaliers may be trained next to a wall that can reflect more sunlight and retain heat overnight or oriented so that they absorb maximum sunlight by training them parallel to the equator. These two strategies allow the season to be extended so that fruit has more time to mature.

A restricted form of training consists of a central stem and a number of paired horizontal branches all trained in the same plane. The most important advantage is that of being able to increase the growth of a branch by training it vertically. Later, one can decrease growth while increasing fruit production by training it horizontally.

== History ==
The word espalier is French, coming from the Italian spalliera, meaning "something to rest the shoulder (spalla) against." During the 17th century, the word initially referred only to the actual trellis or frame on which such a plant was trained to grow, but over time it has come to be used to describe both the practice and the plants themselves.

Espalier as a technique seems to have started with the ancient Romans. In the Middle Ages the Europeans refined it into an art. The practice was popularly used in Europe to produce fruit inside the walls of a typical castle courtyard without interfering with the open space and to decorate solid walls by planting flattened trees near them. Vineyards have used the technique in the training of grapes for hundreds or perhaps even thousands of years.

Belgian fences

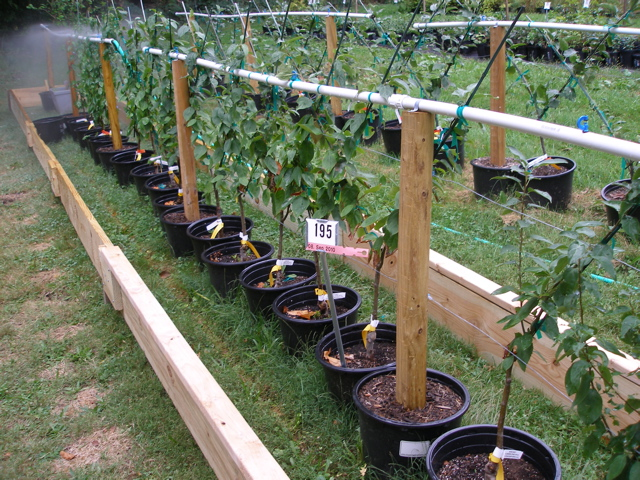
Belgian fence

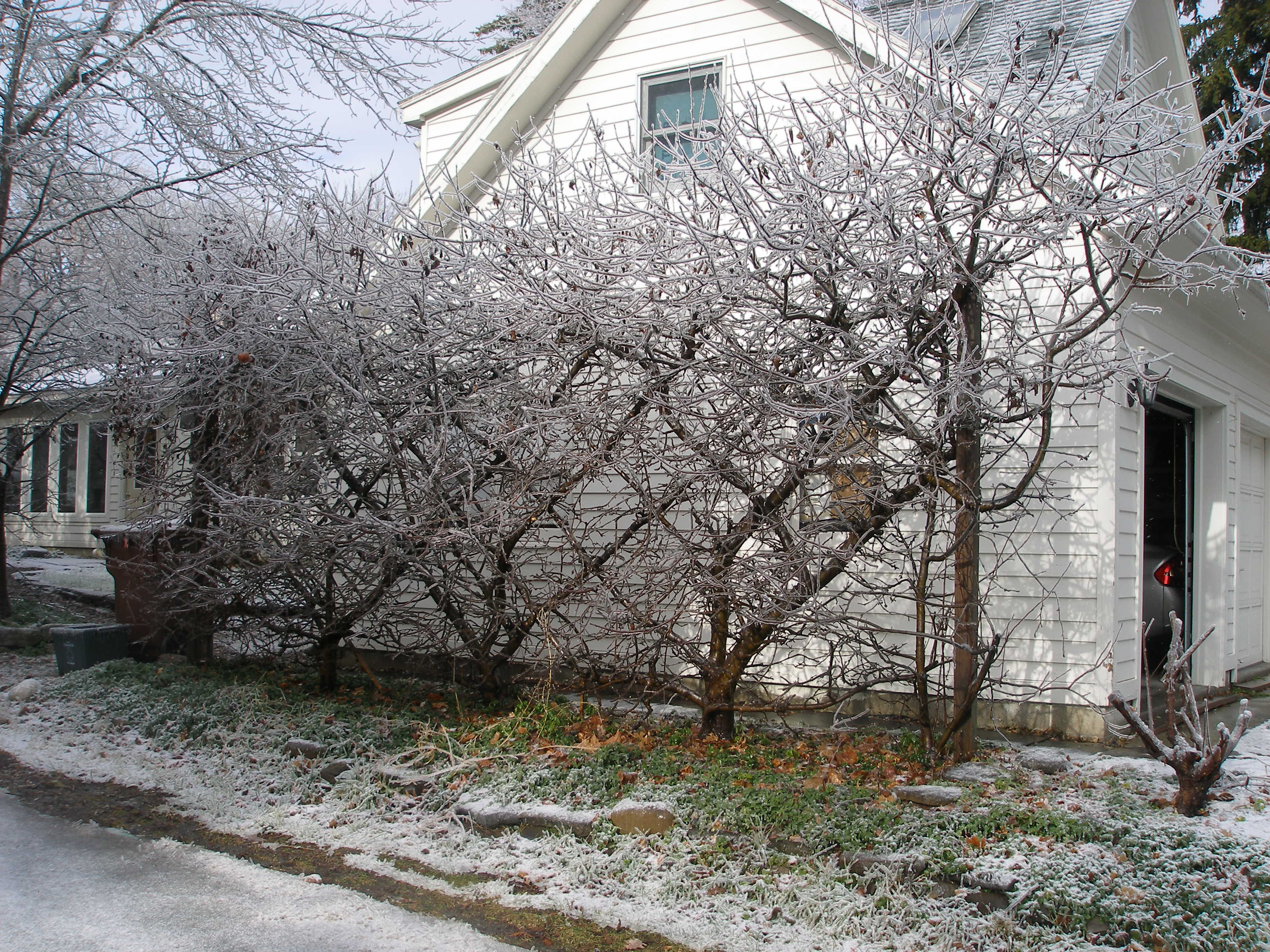
Belgian fence after an ice storm

== Belgian fence ==
A Belgian fence is created by cutting back an unbranched, slender tree to between 40 and 45 centimetres (15 and 18 in) above the ground. The topmost three buds are allowed to form; one in the middle is trained vertically while two others are trained into a V shape. Any other buds are rubbed away. Removing the vertical stem completes the individual V-shaped espalier. By placing many similarly trained trees in a line two feet apart with their branches trained to the same plane, a Belgian fence is created.

The Belgian fence is an intermediary form that can then be used to train onward to many other forms of espalier, including step-over, where the branches are lowered down to the horizontal in autumn while still flexible enough and tied to a trellis; fan, where the branches are lowered and cut back then trained further; and horizontal T, where the branches are trained to horizontal as with step-over but the vertical stem is trained up to another level and cut usually in spring of the second year, where another V shape is created and the resulting branches finally being lowered to another wire in autumn of the second year. Multiple levels of horizontal branching can be trained in this way.

== Species choices ==
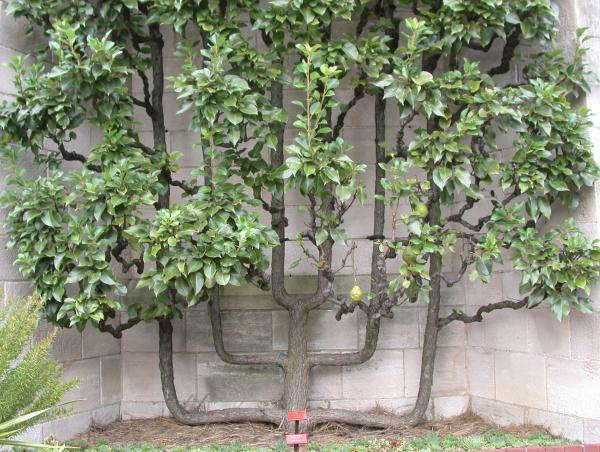
A pear tree espaliered into a cordon. The picture was taken in the garden of the Cloisters in upper Manhattan.

Certain types of trees adapt better to espalier than others, but almost any woody plant can be trained to grow along a flat plane by removing growth outside that plane. Horizontal T training of an apple or pear tree is a good example of the ideal species for espalier. In the spring, the tree is pruned to the lowest wire perhaps 40–45 cm (15–18 in) above the ground. During the summer, buds lengthen into branches; one trained vertically to the next wire while others are trained along the wires. Unnecessary buds are removed by rubbing them away with a thumb. In autumn, the side branches are lowered and tied to the wires completing the level. The following year another level is created.

Examples of species for espalier include:

- Trees:
  - Acer palmatum Japanese maple
  - Cercis canadensis redbud
  - Citrus spp. lemon, orange, tangerine, etc.
  - Coccoloba uvifera sea grape
  - Eriobotrya japonica loquat
  - Euonymus alata winged euonymus
  - Ficus carica fig
  - Forsythia intermedia forsythia
  - Ilex spp. hollies, esp. Ilex cornuta 'Burford' Burford holly
  - Lagerstroemia indica crape myrtle
  - Magnolia grandiflora southern magnolia
  - Magnolia stellata star magnolia
  - Malus spp. apple, crabapple, etc.
  - Olea europia olive
  - Prunus spp. peach, nectarine, plum, almond, etc.
  - Pyrus spp. pear
  - Taxus sp. yew
- Shrubs:
  - Camellia japonica and C. sasanqua Camellia
  - Carissa grandiflora Natal plum
  - Chaenomeles lagenaria Chinese flowering quince
  - Cotoneaster sp. Cotoneaster
  - Gardenia jasminoides Gardenia
  - Juniperus spp. Juniper, esp. Juniperus × pfitzeriana' Pfitzer juniper
  - Ligustrum japonicum Privet
  - Osmanthus fragrans Sweet Olive
  - Photinia glabra Redtip photinia
  - Photinia serrulata Chinese Photinia
  - Podocarpus spp. Podocarpus
  - Pyracantha spp. Firethorn, esp. Pyracantha coccinea Pyracantha coccinea
  - Stewartia Koreana Korean Stewartia
  - Viburnum sp. Viburnum
- Woody vines:
  - Allamanda cathartica Allamanda
  - Ficus pumila Creeping fig
  - Jasminum nudiflorum Winter Jasmine
  - Pyrostegia venusta Flame vine
  - Trachelospermum jasminoides Confederate jasmine

== Designs ==
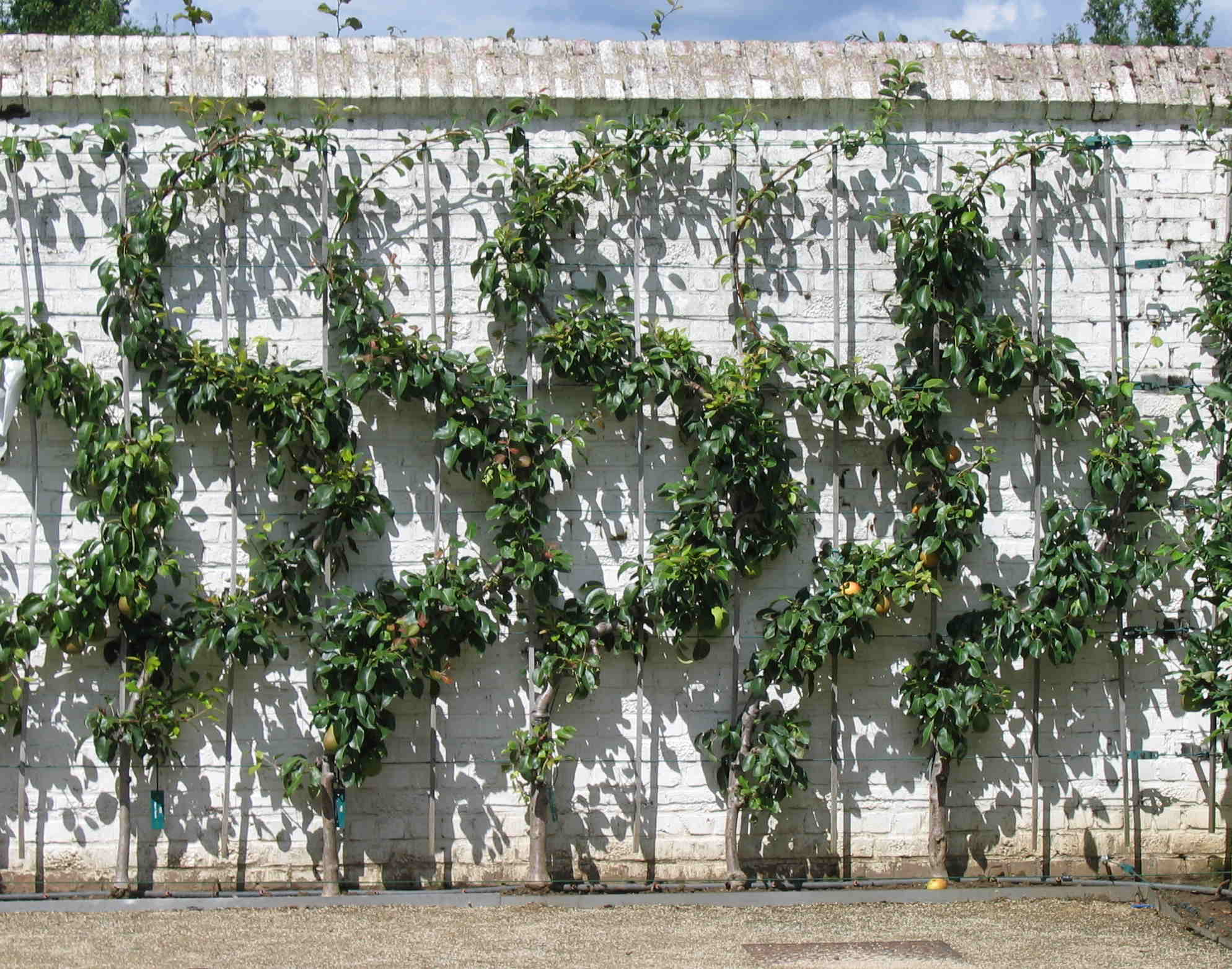
A vertical cordon fruit tree

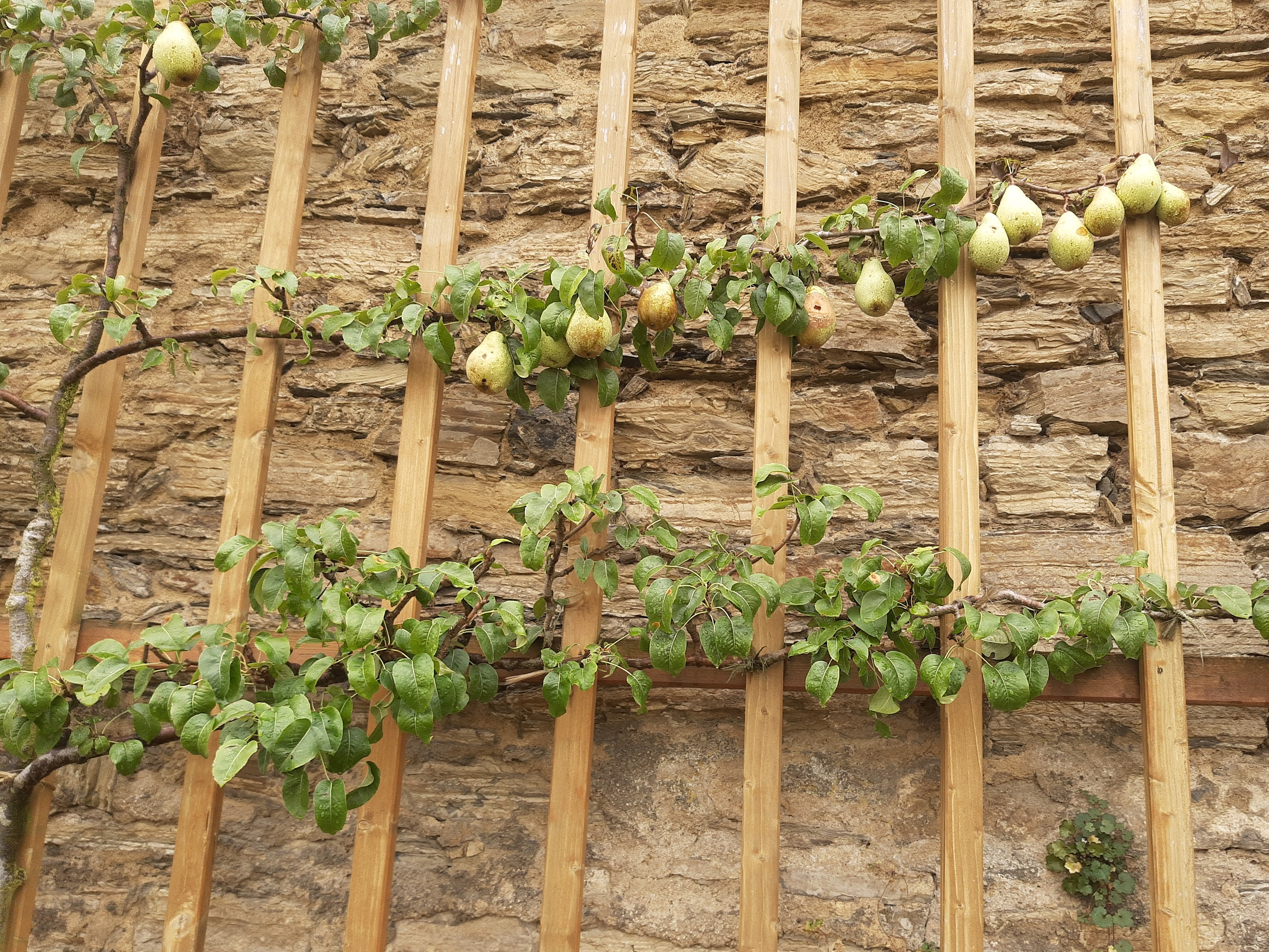
Fruiting espaliered pears in a Baroque garden at Schloss Weilburg

Espalier design often uses traditional formal patterns developed over hundreds of years, but can also employ more modern informal designs. A stunted or deformed plant, or one that already has interesting or unique characteristics, might be just right for an informal espalier.

Common formal patterns include the following styles.

- V-shaped: Tree is cut to a low wire 40–45 cm (15–18 in) from the ground; two buds lengthen into branches which are attached to canes that keep them straight, and the canes are attached to another wire that maintains a V shape. The V shape is the first step in producing many other formal patterns.
- Belgian fence: More than one V-shaped espaliers are planted two feet apart, so their branches cross, and are tied to a trellis.
- Stepover: A Horizontal espalier with only one set of branches tied to a wire around 40 cm (15 in) above the ground. Start with a V shape until desired branch length is attained, but lower branches to the bottom wire by autumn of the first year. Takes only one year to produce the design from a well-rooted unbranched tree (it may take somewhat longer for it to start producing fruit).
- Horizontal T, also referred to as a horizontal cordon: Branches are trained horizontally along evenly spaced wires. Start with a V shape where a third bud is trained straight up to another wire. Train other two branches to stepover. In spring of second year prune the vertical stem to the second wire and again train to a V shape, etc. It takes one year per each level.
- Palmette or fan: Branches grow in a radiating pattern created when the branches of a V-shaped espalier are cut back and lowered slightly. Multiple buds are coaxed to form branches that are tied to a trellis in a radiating pattern.
- Baldassari palmette: A palmette design created around 1950, used primarily for training peaches.
- Cordon: Consists of a main stem with short fruiting spurs tied to a fence or a wire trellis. Probably the simplest and quickest espalier is the single vertical or angled cordon. The weakness of the vertical cordon is that it is difficult to rein in the vigor of the tree. An angled cordon reduces the vigor of its growth and increases fruit production.
- Verrier candelabra (Verrier palmette) is a type of vertical cordon with multiple upright stems that usually starts from a V shape.
- Gaucher palmette is a type of vertical cordon with multiple upright stems.
- Drapeau marchand: A cordon trained at an angle with the branches on its upper side trained to a right angle from the main stem.
- U double and other U-shaped espalier is just another way of referring to a double vertical cordon.

== Plant selection, installation, and maintenance ==
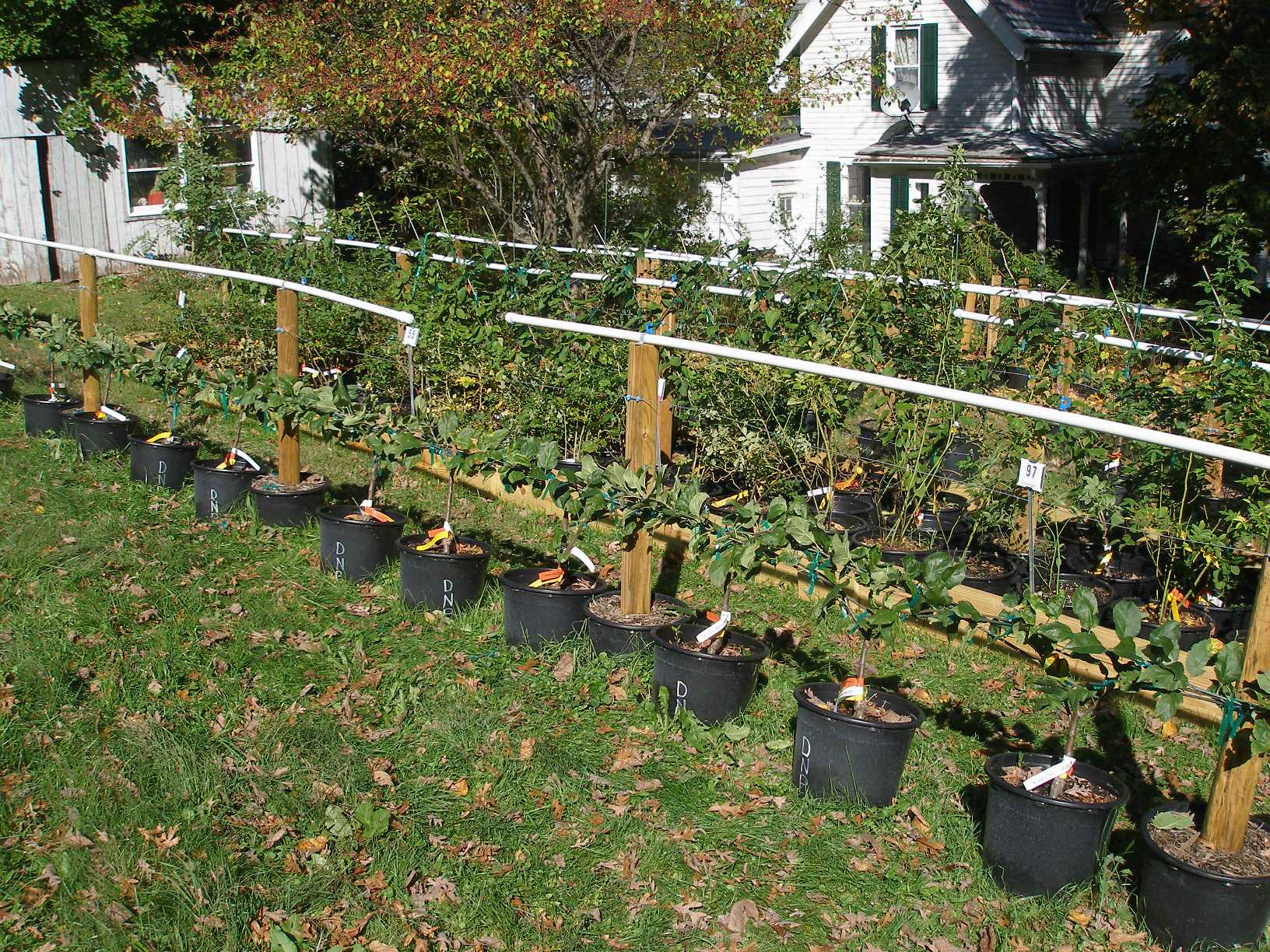
A stepover espalier with recently tied branches

Espalier plants on solid walls are usually installed 15–30 cm (6–12 in) from the base of that wall, to allow space below ground for roots to grow in all directions as well as space above ground for good air circulation and pest control. Supports for wire guides, which are generally necessary to train an espalier into a design, are installed first, directly into a wall constructed of suitable material. Masonry walls are ideal for placing U-bolts, eye bolts, or eye screws, anchored with either plastic plugs or expandable lead shields, directly into the mortar joints. Wooden walls may be better fitted with galvanized nipples, using turnbuckles for adjustment of the wire tautness.

Suitable, established and healthy plants, three to four feet tall and perhaps in three-gallon containers, are available from most nurseries. Some may even have trellises already installed. These plants could also be good candidates for espalier treatment if their form is similar to the intended design, as they frequently have already been pruned into a flattened overall plant shape. All that is required for such specimens is transplanting. Unpruned plants benefit from being allowed to become well established following transplant, before pruning them gradually into their flattened profile and training them as designed. Any major pruning needed is generally accomplished either while the plant is dormant or, for flowering plants, during the proper season for pruning that species. Bending and training of the limbs that will remain in the design is done during the progression of the summer season, when they are most flexible.

== Related tree shaping practices ==
- Bonsai: A small tree shaped to mimic the form of a full grown tree
- Grafting: A horticultural technique of joining two or more plants together
- Pleaching: Way of creating a hedge with plants for stock control
- Topiary: The clipping of foliage of perennial plants into clearly defined shapes
- Tree Shaping: Creating with living trees structures and art

== See also ==
- Fruit tree forms Shaping fruit trees mainly to encourage fruit production
