= Ramingstein =

- Municipality
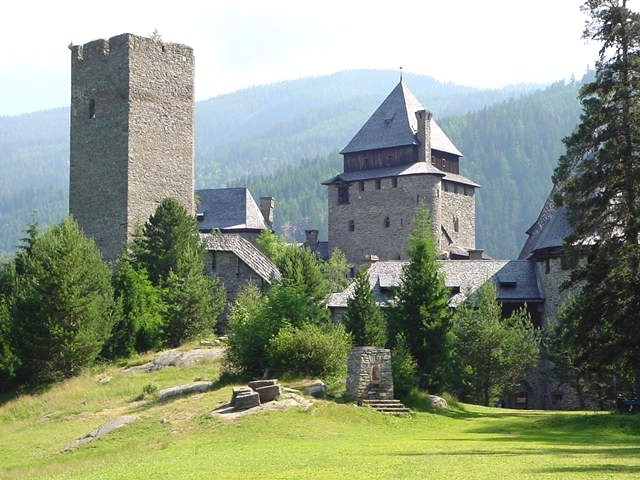
- Finstergrün Castle

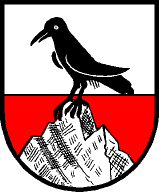
- Coat of arms

- Location within Austria
- Coordinates: 47°04′32″N 13°50′12″E
- Country: Austria
- State: Salzburg
- District: Tamsweg

Government
  - Mayor: Peter Rotschopf (ÖVP)

Area
  - Total: 94.15 km^{2} (36.35 sq mi)
- Elevation: 970 m (3,180 ft)

Population (2018-01-01)
  - Total: 1,059
  - Density: 11.25/km^{2} (29.13/sq mi)
- Time zone: UTC+1 (CET)
  - Summer (DST): UTC+2 (CEST)
- Postal code: 5591
- Area code: 06475
- Vehicle registration: TA
- Website: www.ramingstein.at

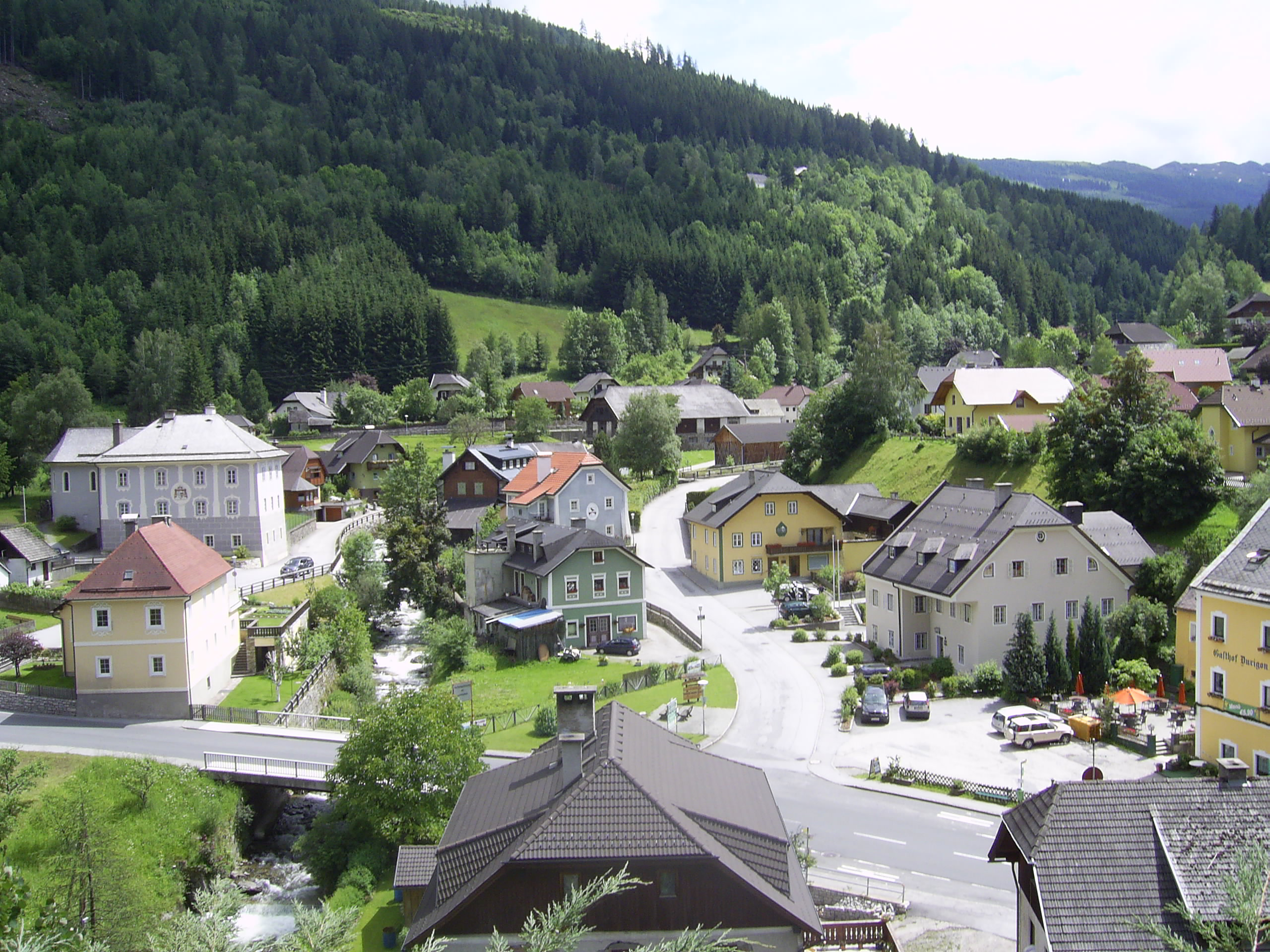
Panorama of Ramingstein with Schloss Wintergrün (left)

Ramingstein is a municipality in the district of Tamsweg in the state of Salzburg in Austria.

== Geography ==
Ramingstein lies in the far southeast of the state of Salzburg at the meeting of the states of Salzburg, Styria, and Carinthia. It is the only municipality in the Lungau that is below 1000 m in elevation. It lies directly on the Mur.

== Attractions ==
- Schloss Wintergrün, a town mansion
- Finstergrün Castle (Burg Finstergrün), a medieval castle ruin with a modern but medieval-looking extension
- Krameterhof - Sepp Holzer's farm is situated on the slopes of Mount Schwarzenberg at varying elevations ranging from 1100 to 1500 metres above sea level. It is the archetype for Holzer Permaculture. The exceptionally harsh climatic conditions in the area are generally considered inappropriate for farming. Nevertheless, he has managed to cultivate a variety of crops, mainly heirloom cultivars, but also exotic plants like kiwis and sweet chestnut.
