= Fruit tree pruning =

Cutting of selected parts of a fruit tree

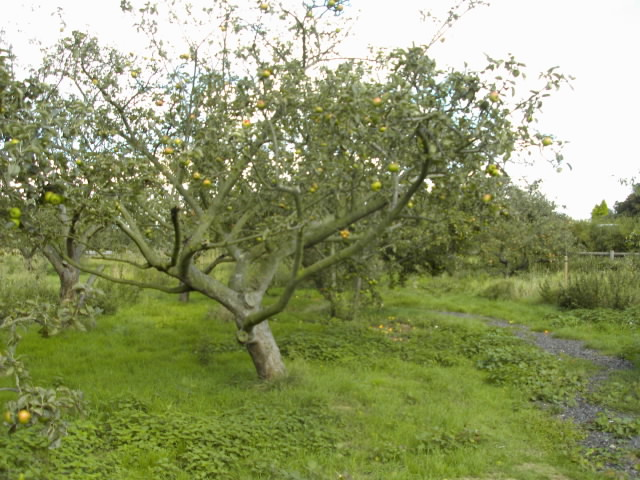
A community apple orchard originally planted for productive use during the 1920s, in Westcliff on Sea (Essex, England), illustrating long neglected trees that have recently been pruned to renew their health and cropping potential

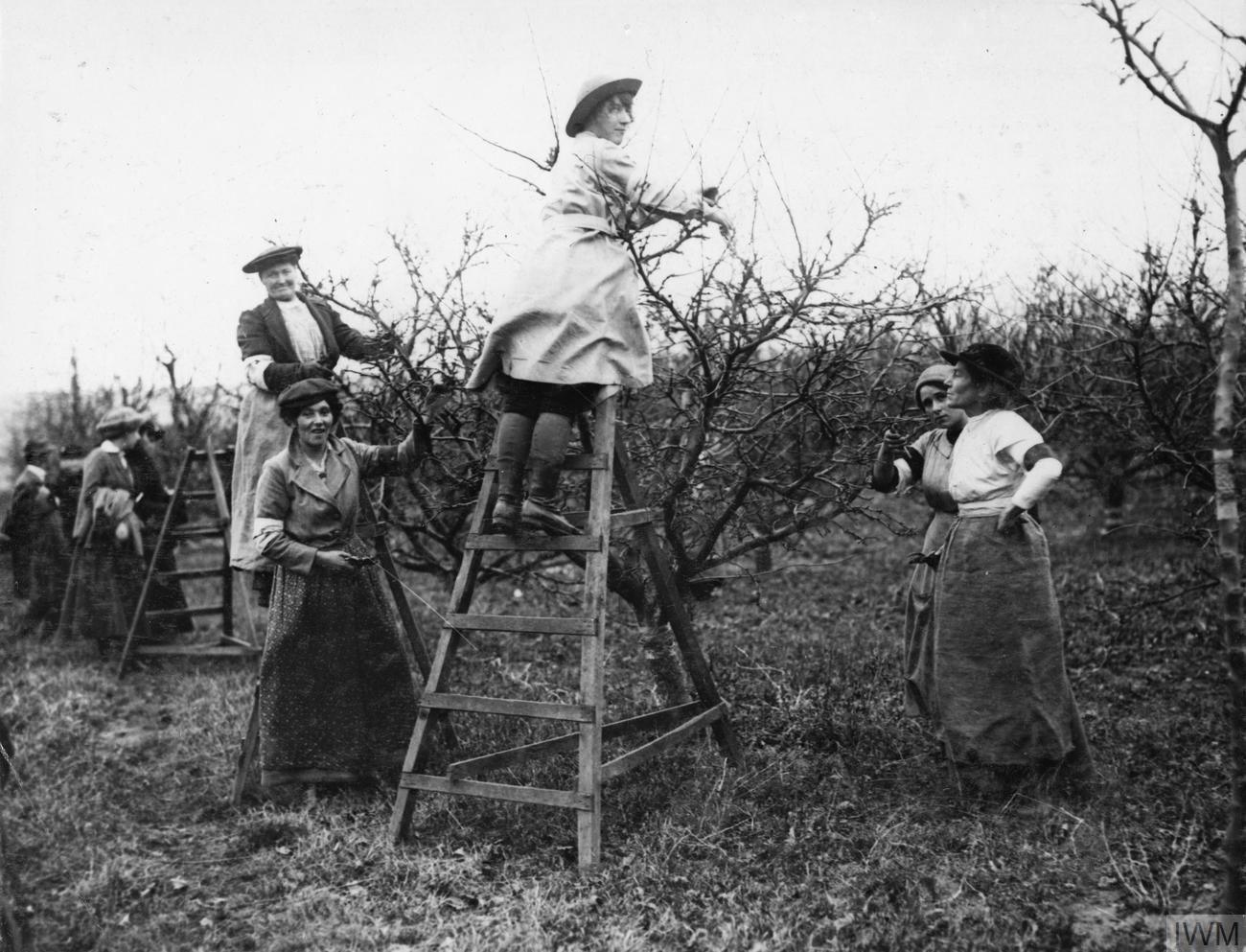
Agricultural workers pruning an apple tree c. 1915-1918

Fruit tree pruning is the cutting and removing of selected parts of a fruit tree. It spans a number of horticultural techniques. Pruning often means cutting branches back, sometimes removing smaller limbs entirely. It may also mean removal of young shoots, buds, and leaves.

Established orchard practice of both organic and nonorganic types typically includes pruning. Pruning can control growth, remove dead or diseased wood, and stimulate the formation of flowers and fruit buds. It is widely stated that careful attention to pruning and training young trees improves their later productivity and longevity, and that good pruning and training can also prevent later injury from weak crotches or forks (where a tree trunk splits into two or more branches) that break from the weight of fruit, snow, or ice on the branches.

Some sustainable agriculture or permaculture personalities, such as Sepp Holzer and Masanobu Fukuoka, advocate and practice no-pruning methods, which runs counter to the widespread confidence in the idea that pruning produces superior results compared with not pruning. Many books about fruit-growing assert advantages and disadvantages of pruning or not pruning, although without randomized controlled trials, it is hard to separate theorizing and traditional knowledge from evidence-based recommendations.

== Overview ==
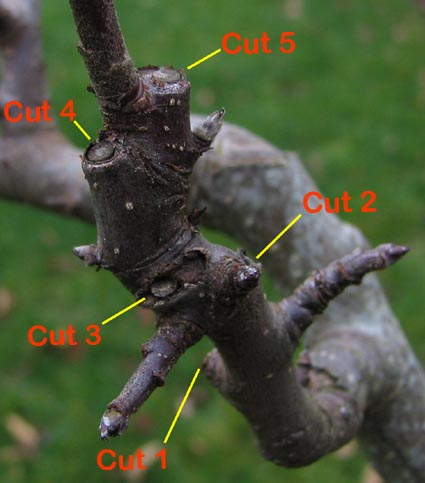
An apple tree sprout is being converted to a branched, fruit-bearing spur by an arborist. Numbers show the sequence of cuts, which occurred during two years.

Plants form new tissue in an area called the meristem, located near the tips of roots and shoots, where active cell division takes place. Meristem growth is aimed at ensuring that leaves are quickly elevated into sunlight, and that roots are able to penetrate deeply into the soil. Once adequate height and length is achieved by the stems and roots, they begin to thicken to support the plant. On the shoots, these growing tips of the plant are called apical buds. The apical meristem (or tip) produces the growth hormone auxin, which not only promotes cell division, but also diffuses downwards and inhibits the development of lateral bud growth that otherwise competes with the apical tip for light and nutrients. Removing the apical tip and its suppressive hormone lets lower, dormant lateral buds develop, and the buds between the leaf stalk and stem produce new shoots that compete to become lead growth.

Manipulating this natural response to damage (known as the principle of apical dominance) by processes such as pruning (as well as coppicing and pollarding) allows the arborist to determine the shape, size, and productivity of many fruiting trees and bushes. The main aim when pruning fruit trees is usually to maximize fruit yield. Unpruned trees tend to produce large numbers of small fruits that may be difficult to reach when harvesting by hand. Branches can become broken by the weight of the crop, and the cropping may become biennial (that is, bearing fruit only every other year). Overpruned trees on the other hand tend to produce light crops of large, flavourless fruit that does not store well. Careful pruning balances shoot growth and fruit production.

One of the simplest instructions given in nearly every article or book chapter on the subject is that no branches should cross each other, that is, rub against each other, and that one of them should be selected and removed.

== Formative pruning of bush trees ==
In the early years of the tree's life, it is important to develop a framework sufficiently strong to bear the weight of crops. This requires formative pruning to reinforce the tree. Formative pruning of apple (Malus pumila) and pear (Pyrus communis) trees should be carried out in the dormant winter months. For the Northern Hemisphere, this should occur between November and March; For the Southern Hemisphere, June and September. Stone fruits—such as cherries, plums, and gages—have different requirements, and should not be pruned in dormant months.

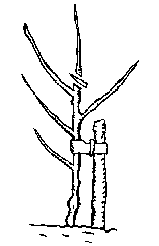
One-year-old tree

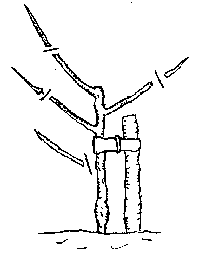
Two-year-old tree

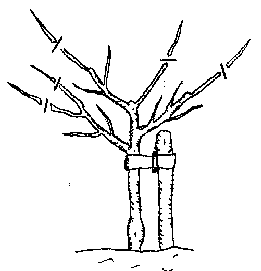
Three-year-old tree

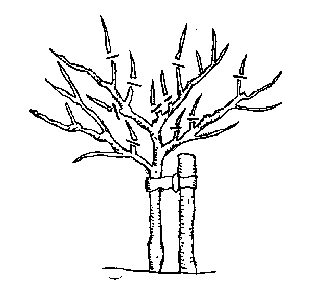
Four-year-old tree

=== Maiden tree ===
A maiden whip (a one-year-old tree with no side shoots) should be pruned to a bud with two buds below it at about 80 cm (31 in) from the ground immediately after planting to produce primary branches during the first growing season. A feathered maiden (that is, a one-year-old tree with several side branches) should have its main stem pruned back to three or four strong shoots at 80 cm (31 in) from the ground. Side shoots should be shortened by two thirds of their length to an upward or outward facing bud. Lower shoots should be removed flush with the stem.

=== Two year ===
Remove lower shoots and prune between three and five of the best-placed shoots by half to an upwards or outwards facing bud to form what becomes the tree's main structural branches. Remove any inward-facing shoots.

=== Three year ===
Prune leading shoots of branches selected to extend the framework by half, to a bud facing in the desired direction. Select four good laterals to fill the framework and shorten these by a half. Prune any remaining laterals to four buds to form fruiting spurs.

=== Four year ===
The tree has begun to fruit and requires only limited formative pruning. Shorten leaders by one third and prune laterals not required to extend the framework to four buds.

=== Five year and onwards ===
The tree is established, and should be pruned annually as described in the following section.

== Pruning the cropping tree ==
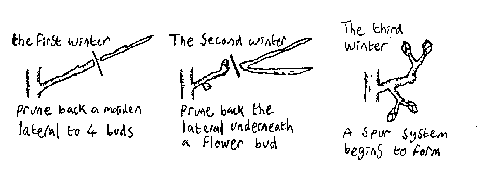
Spur pruning

Before pruning, distinguish between spur-bearing varieties, tip-bearing varieties, and an intermediate between the two that bears both on spurs and at the tips. Spur-bearing trees occur more frequently than tip-bearing trees, and they bear most of their fruit yearly at the end of short lateral pieces of wood (spurs) up to about 10 centimetres (4 in) long.

Spur-bearing types include apples of the varieties 'Cox's Orange Pippin', 'James Grieve' and 'Sunset', and pears such as 'Conference', 'Doyenne du Commice', and 'Williams Bon Chretien'. Tip-bearers on the other hand produce most of their fruit buds at the tips of slender shoots grown the previous summer, and include the apples 'Worcester Pearmain' and 'Irish Peach', and the pears such as 'Jargonelle' and 'Josephine de Malines'. There are basically three types of pruning that are applied once the main shape of the tree has been established. These are:

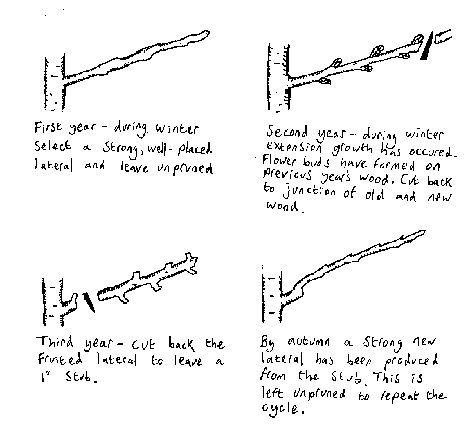
Renewal pruning

- Spur pruning: Spur bearing varieties form spurs naturally, but spur growth can also be induced.
- Renewal pruning: This also depends on the tendency of many apple and pear trees to form flower buds on unpruned two-year-old laterals. It is a technique best used for the strong laterals on the outer part of the tree where there is room for such growth. Pruning long-neglected fruit trees is a task that should be undertaken over a lengthy period, with not more than one third of the branches that require removal being taken each year.
- Regulatory pruning: This is carried out on the tree as a whole, and is aimed at keeping the tree and its environment healthy, e.g., by keeping the centre open so that air can circulate; removing dead or diseased wood; preventing branches from becoming overcrowded (branches should be roughly 50 cm (20 in) apart and spurs not less than 25 cm (10 in) apart along the branch framework); and preventing any branches from crossing.

== Pruning of tip bearers ==
Tip-bearers should be pruned lightly in winter using the regulatory system (see above). Any maiden shoots less than 25 cm (10 in) in length should be left untouched as they have fruit buds at their tips. Longer shoots are spur pruned to prevent overcrowding and to stimulate the production of more short-tip-bearing shoots the following year. Branch leaders are 'tipped', removing the top three or four buds to a bud facing in the desired direction to make them branch out and so produce more tip-bearing shoots.

== See also ==
- Arboriculture
- Fruit tree forms
- Fruit tree pollination
- Fruit tree propagation
- Orchards
