= Sepp Holzer =

Austrian farmer and permaculture teacher

- Born: July 24, 1942 (age 83); Ramingstein, Austria
- Known for: Permaculture, agroforestry

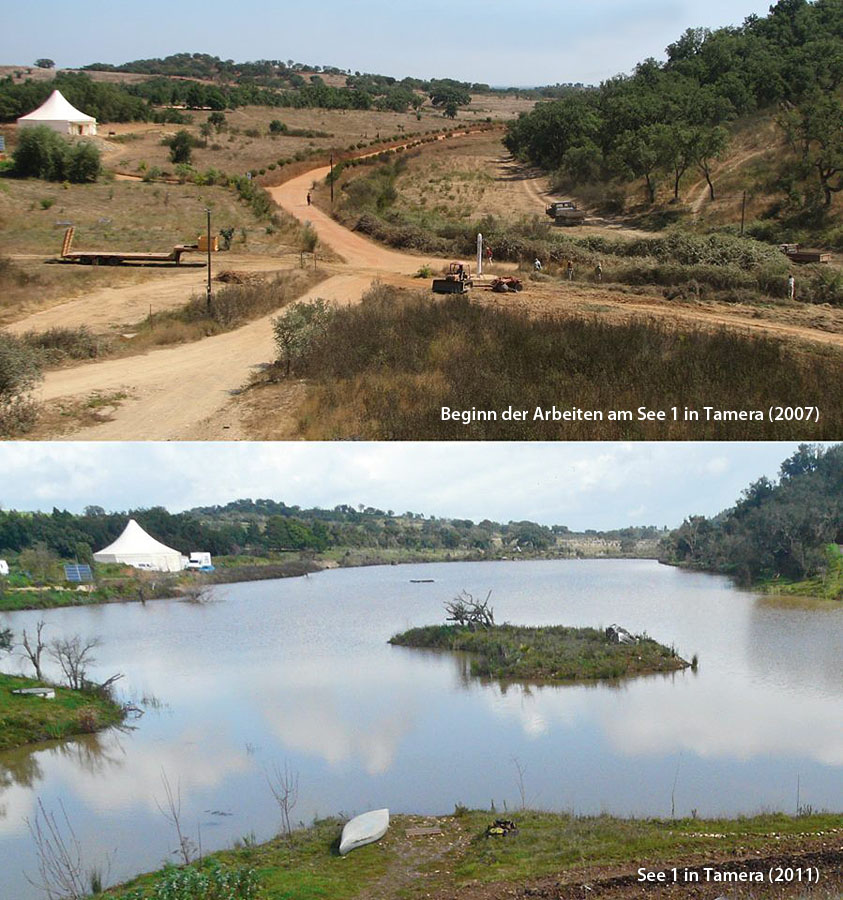
A rainwater harvesting landscape designed by Holzer in Tamera, Portugal

Josef "Sepp" Holzer (born July 24, 1942, in Ramingstein, State of Salzburg, Austria) is a farmer, an author, and an international consultant for natural agriculture. After an upbringing in a traditional Catholic rural family, he took over his parents' mountain farm business in 1962 and became well known for his use of ecological farming, or permaculture, techniques at high altitudes (1,100 to 1,500 meters (3,600 to 4,900 ft) after being unsuccessful with regular farming methods.

Holzer was called the "agricultural rebel" by the Austrian biologist Bernd Lötsch because he persisted, despite being fined and even threatened with prison for practices such as not pruning his fruit trees.

== Current work ==
As of 2010, he was still conducting permaculture ("Holzer Permaculture") seminars both at his Krameterhof farm and worldwide, while continuing to work on his alpine farm.

He is author of several books, works nationally as permaculture-activist in the established agricultural industry, and works internationally as adviser for ecological agriculture.

He is the subject of the film The Agro Rebel, directed by Bertram Verhaag.

== Bibliography ==
- Sepp Holzer: The Rebel Farmer (2002)
- Sepp Holzer's Permaculture: A Practical Guide to Small-Scale, Integrative Farming and Gardening (2011)
- Desert or Paradise: Restoring Endangered Landscapes Using Water Management, Including Lake and Pond Construction (2012)

== Filmography ==
- Permaculture Now! - Desert or Paradise? (2013)
- Sepp Holzer's Permaculture: 3 Films About Permaculture Farming (2015)
