= Umshiang Double-Decker Root Bridge =

Living root bridge in Meghalya, India

Coordinates: 25.2512622°N 91.6719456°E

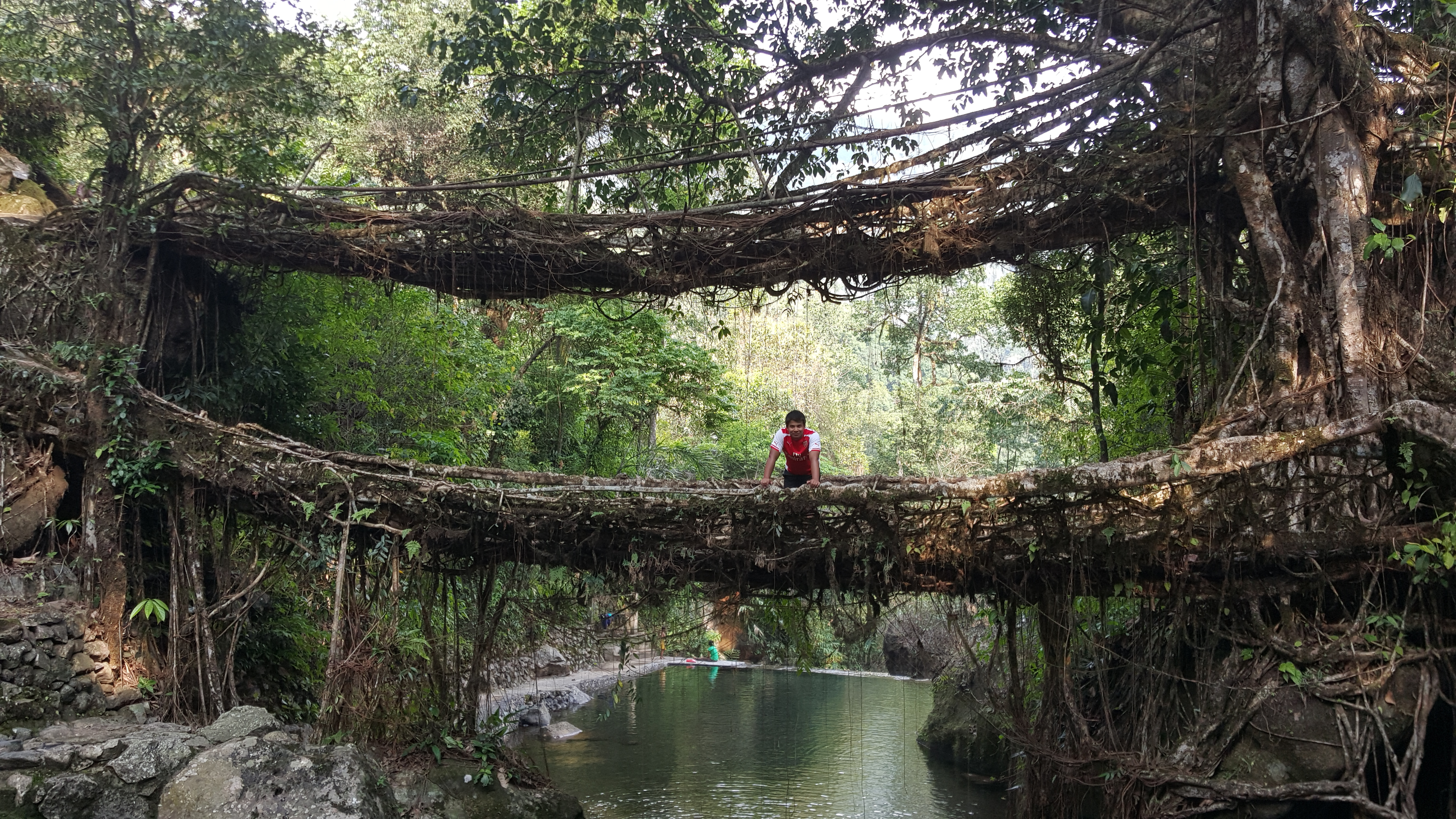
Umshiang Double-Decker Root Bridge in 2015

Umshiang Double-Decker Root Bridge is a living root bridge in Meghalaya, India. It can be reached via trekking 45 kilometres (28 mi), or 6500 steps, from Cherrapunji. There is also a waterfall nearby.

Due to tourism, the health of the root bridge has degraded. A replica of the bridge has been made in Nongriat in Cherrapunji to present the Khasi and Jaiñtia peoples' craft of building bridges from the secondary roots of trees.

These living bridges are grown from a special type of rubber tree. As the roots grow, so the strength of the bridge increases. They take around 25 years to grow and operate, but can carry the weight of 50 people and go on functioning for 500 years.

The root bridges are honoured as the Tajmahal of Meghalaya. Meghalaya presented the root bridge at its 70th Republic Day ceremony.

== See also ==
- Breathing bridge
