= Tyrna =

- village
- Interactive map of Tyrna
- Country: India
- State: Meghalaya
- District: East Khasi Hills

Languages
  - Official: English
- Time zone: UTC+5:30 (IST)
- Telephone code: 793108
- Vehicle registration: ML
- Nearest city: Shillong

Tyrna is a village in the East Khasi Hills district of Meghalaya State, in north-eastern India. A succession of stone steps connect the community with neighboring village of Nongriat, just below the Cherrapunji-Laitkynsew bridle path.
