= Baubotanik =

Building term

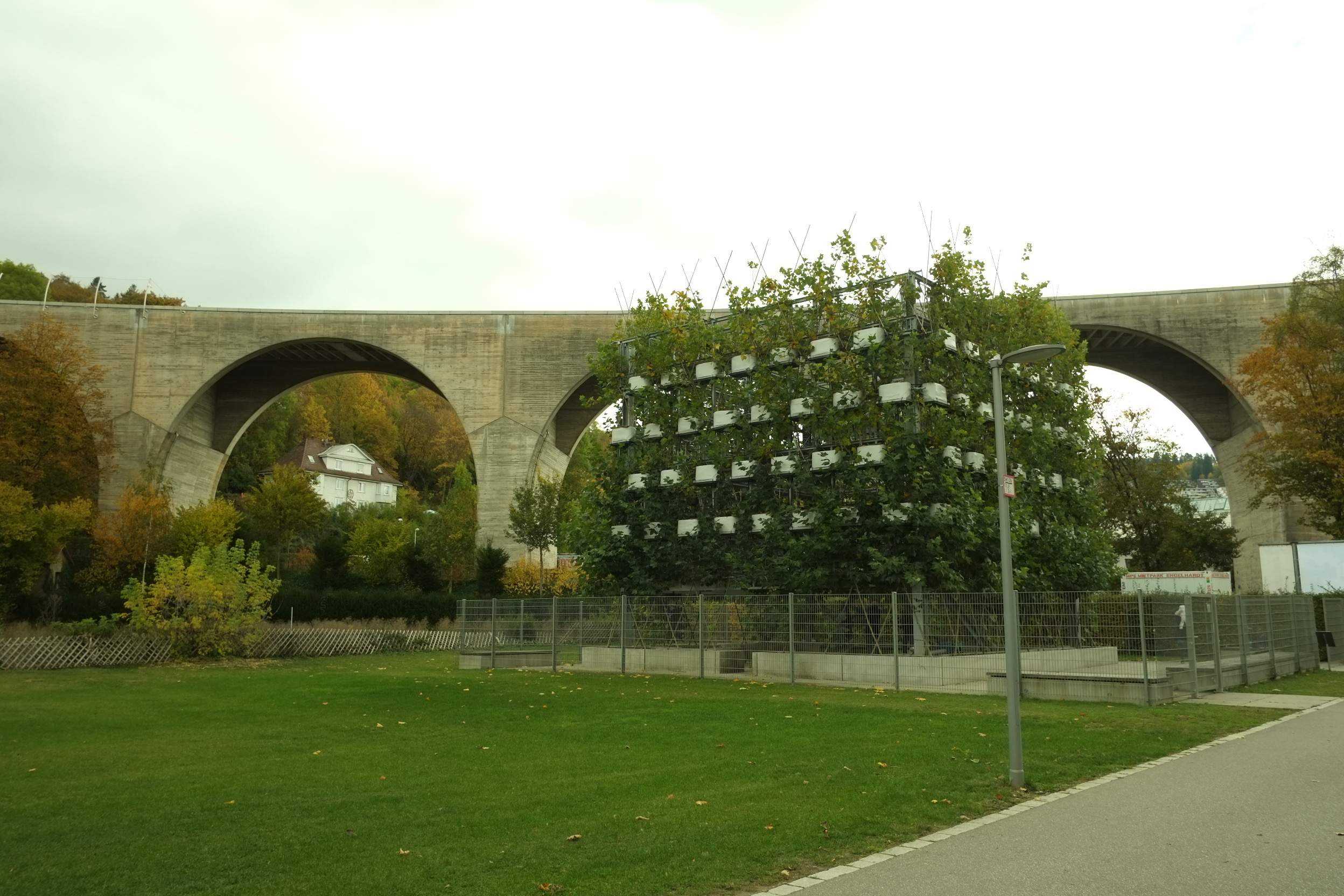
Structure made with plane trees for the Baden-Württemberg State Horticultural Show in Nagold

Baubotanik is a building method in which architectural structures are created through the interaction of technical joints and plant growth. The term entails the practice of designing and building living structures using living plants. In this regard, living and non-living elements are intertwined in such a way that they grow together into plant-technical composite structures.

The Baubotanik method combines the aesthetic and ecological qualities of living trees with the static functions and structural requirements of buildings, thereby reducing the need for artificial building materials. The structures provide valuable habitats for a variety of animal species and make conventional foundations redundant, due to their root anchorage.

The use of Baubotanik is not a new invention and can be found in various historical and cultural contexts, such as the Tanzlinden (“dancing lime”) tree in Germany and living root bridge in North-East India. Common in the Indian state of Meghalaya and grown by the Khasi and Jaintia, the bridges consist of the aerial roots of rubber fig trees (Ficus elastica) and are grown over rivers to form walkable bridges. While the process can take fifteen years to complete, the bridges can be reinforced with natural materials and can withstand the strongest tropical storms. Furthermore, since the turn of the millennium, ‘willow churches’ (made of willow rods and lacking a fixed roof) have been constructed on various former garden show grounds, yet provide only limited functionality as buildings.

== Research ==
An early publication in this field of study was the article Baubotanik: Mit lebenden Pflanzen konstruieren (translating to “Baubotanik: Designing with Living Plants) by Ferdinand Ludwig and Oliver Storz in 2005 in the magazine Baumeister. The term “Baubotanik” was defined in 2007 at the Institute of Theory of Architecture and Design (Institut für Grundlagen moderner Architektur und Entwerfen) at the University of Stuttgart, where its concept was scientifically further developed. Within the scope of the research, simple experimental buildings were constructed, such as a footbridge and a Baubotanik tower that illustrated the possibilities of creating larger Baubotanik structures by adding individual plants. Moreover, a two-story bird-watching station was planted in the town of Waldkirchen as part of the Bavarian State Horticultural Show 2007. Subsequently, a three-story plane tree cube was created for the Baden-Württemberg State Horticultural Show 2012 in Nagold.

Since 2017, the Baubotanik field of research has been based at the Professorship for Green Technologies in Landscape Architecture at the Technical University of Munich.

== See also ==
- Green building – Structures and processes of building structures that are more environmentally responsible
- Living root bridge – Type of pedestrian bridge made with live trees
- Tree shaping – Use of living trees to create structures and art
- Green architecture – Architecture designed to minimize environmental impact
- Green infrastructure – Sustainable and resilient infrastructure
- Living sculpture – Type of sculpture

== Literature ==
- Middleton, Wilfrid & Habibi, Amin & Shankar, Sanjeev & Ludwig, Ferdinand. (2020). Characterizing Regenerative Aspects of Living Root Bridges. Sustainability. 12. 10.3390/su12083267. Open access article link
- Well, Friederike & Ludwig, Ferdinand. (2020). Blue-green architecture: A case study analysis considering the synergetic effects of water and vegetation. 9. 191–202. 10.1016/j.foar.2019.11.001. Open access article link
- Ludwig, Ferdinand & Middleton, Wilfrid & Gallenmüller, Friederike & Rogers, Patrick & Speck, Thomas. (2019). Living bridges using aerial roots of ficus elastica – an interdisciplinary perspective. Scientific Reports. 9. 10.1038/s41598-019-48652-w. Open access article link
- Ludwig, Ferdinand & Schönle, Daniel & Vees, Ute. (2016). Baubotanik - Building Architecture with Nature. International Online Journal Biotope City. PDF download and open access article link
- Ludwig, Ferdinand & Mihaylov, Boyan & Schwinn, Tobias. (2013). Emergent Timber: A tool for designing the growth process of Baubotanik structures PDF download and open access article link
