= Living root bridge =

Type of pedestrian bridge made with live trees

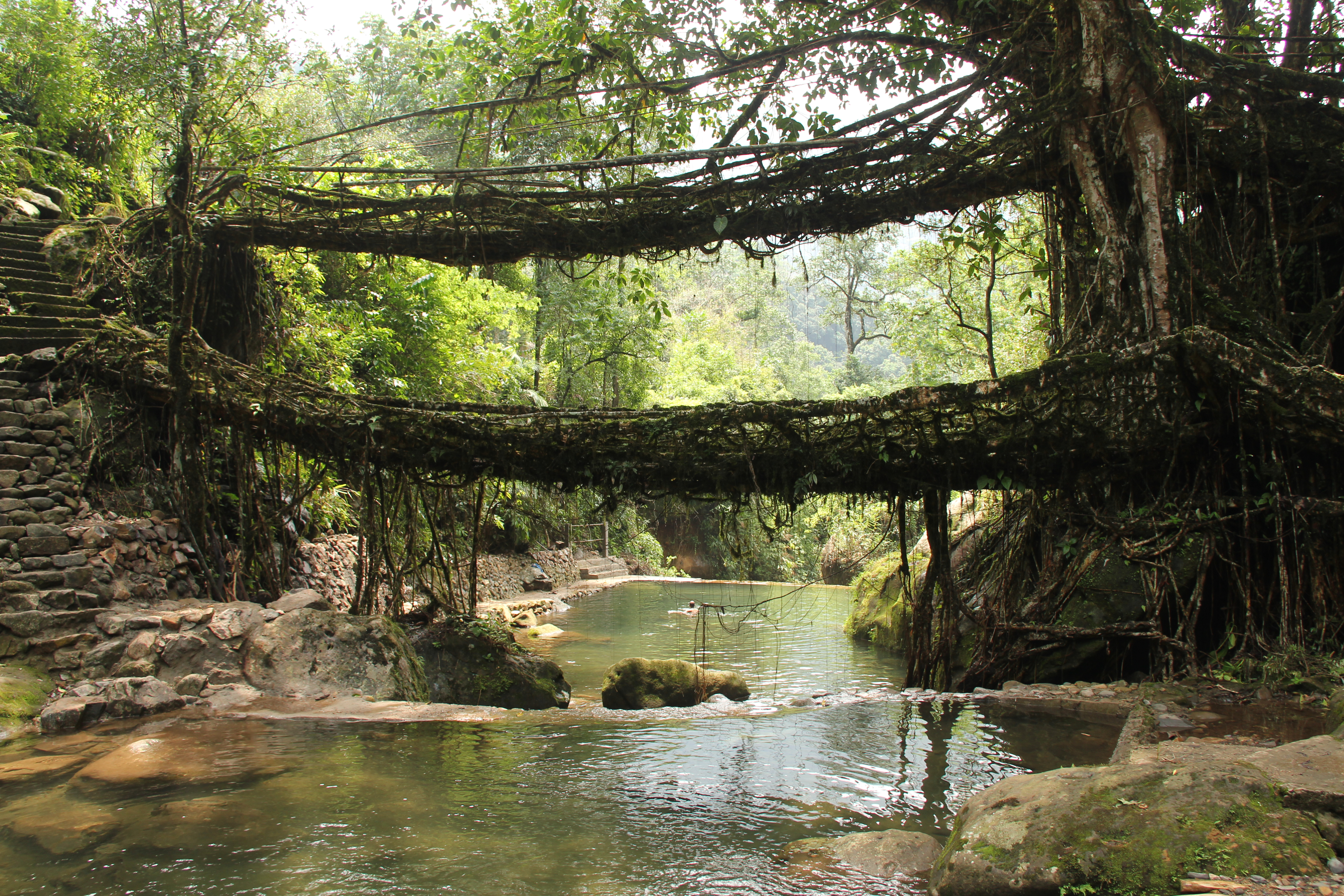
- Double living root bridge in East Khasi Hills (2011)
- Crosses: Creeks

Characteristics
- Material: Living trees roots
- Trough construction: Rocks
- Total length: examples over 50m
- Width: examples over 1.5 metres (5 ft)
- Design life: up to 500 years

History
- Architect: War Khasis, War Jaintias, Konyak Nagas, Baduy people, and other groups

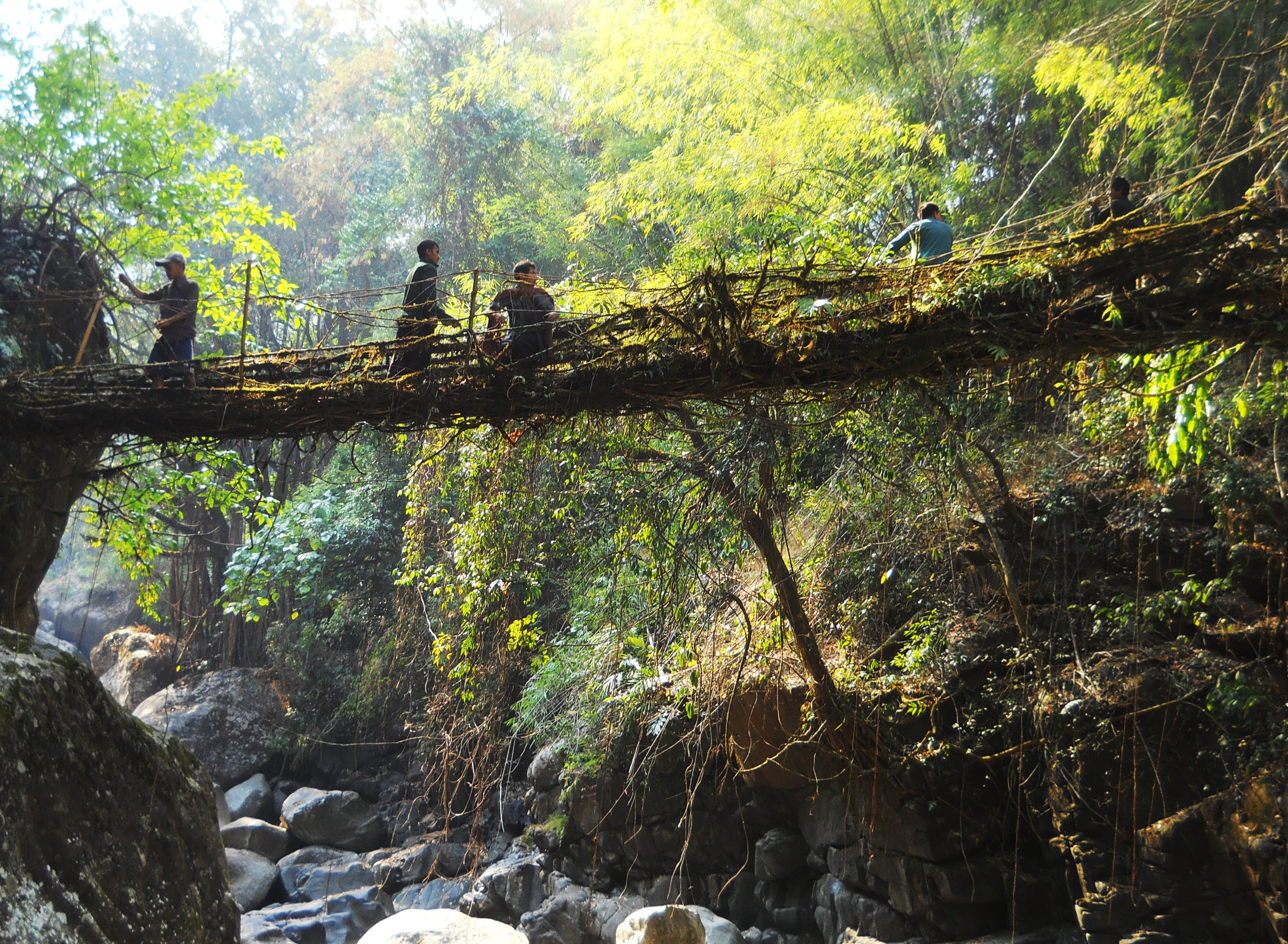
Local Khasis using the young, pliable aerial roots of a fig tree to create a new railing for a bridge near the village of Kongthong

Living root bridges are a kind of tree shaping in which rivers are spanned by bridges formed out of the roots of ficus plants. Due to their being made from living, growing trees, they "show a very wide variety of structural typologies, with various aspects of particular bridges resembling characteristics of suspension bridges, cable-stayed bridges, arches, trusses, and simply-supported beams." They are common in the Indian state of Meghalaya.

The structures are handmade from the aerial roots of rubber fig trees (Ficus elastica) by the Khasi and Jaiñtia peoples of the mountainous terrain along the southern part of the Shillong Plateau. Most of the bridges grow on steep slopes of subtropical moist broadleaf forest between 50 and 1,150 m (160 and 3,770 ft) above sea level.

As long as the tree from which it is formed remains healthy, the roots in the bridge can naturally grow thick and strengthen. New roots can grow throughout the tree's life and must be pruned or manipulated to strengthen the bridge. Once mature, some bridges can have as many as 50 or more people crossing, and have a lifespan of several hundred years. Without active care, many bridges have decayed or grown wild, becoming unusable. Written documentation of living root bridges was sparse until the 2010s, but in 2017, researchers geo-located a total of 75 living bridges.

Living root bridges have also been created in the Indian state of Nagaland, in Indonesia at Jembatan akar on the island of Sumatra, and in the Banten province of Java, by the Baduy people.

== History ==
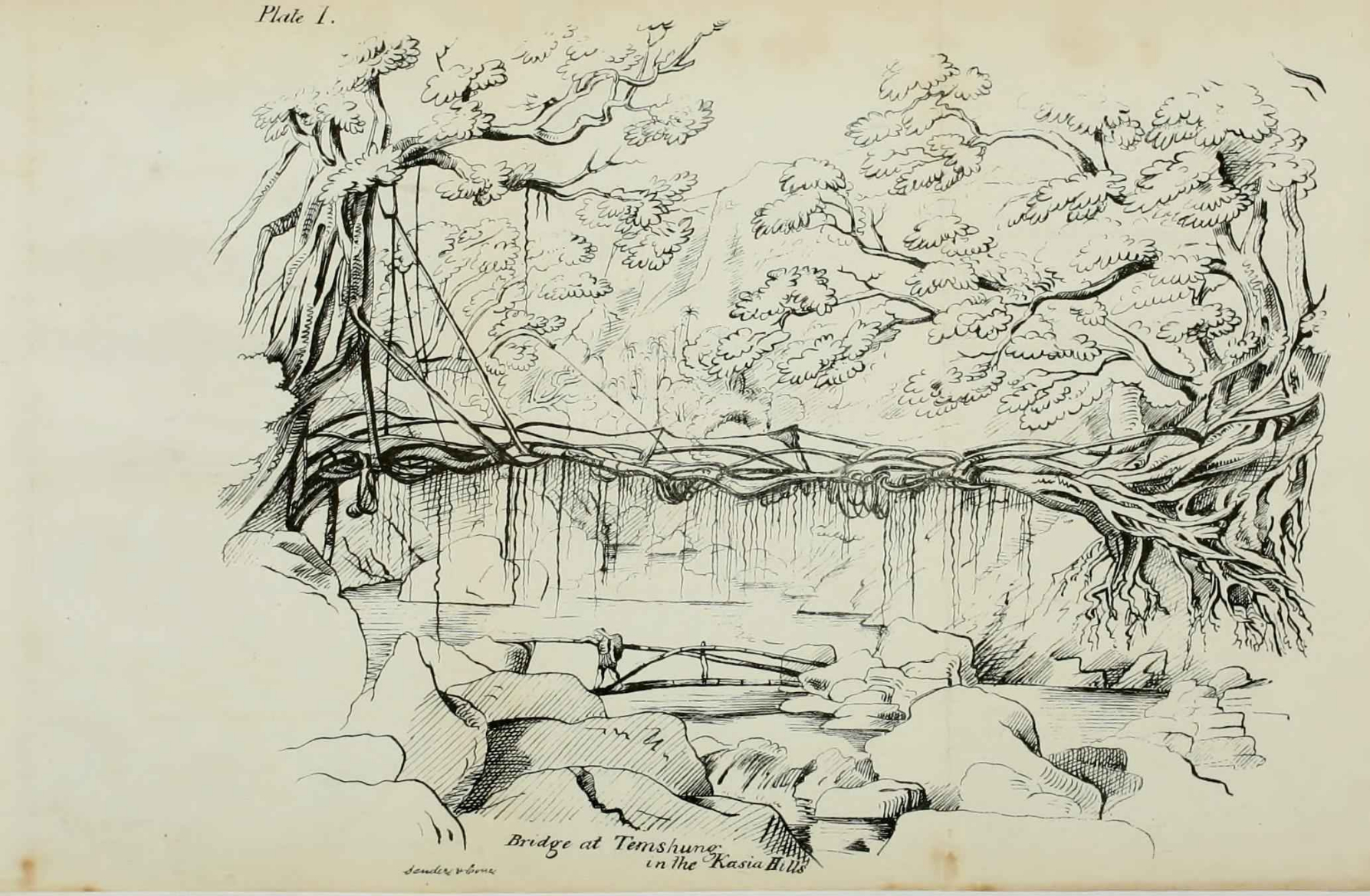
Living root bridge by Henry Yule published in Journal of Asiatic Society, 1844

The Khasi people do not know when or how the tradition of living root bridges started. In Khasi mythology, their ancestors descended from a living roots ladder that connected heaven and earth, jingkieng ksiar. Historically, the earliest written record of Sohra's (Cherrapunji's) living root bridges is by Henry Yule, who expressed astonishment about them in the 1844 Journal of the Asiatic Society of Bengal.

== Methods of creation ==
A living root bridge is formed by guiding the pliable roots of the rubber fig tree across a stream or river, and then allowing the roots to grow and strengthen over time until they can hold the weight of a human being. The young roots are sometimes tied or twisted together, and are often encouraged to combine via the process of inosculation. As the rubber fig tree is well suited to anchoring itself to steep slopes and rocky surfaces, it is not difficult to encourage its roots to take hold on the opposite sides of river banks.

As they are made from living, growing organisms, the useful lifespan of any given living root bridge is variable. It is thought that, under ideal conditions, a root bridge can last for many hundreds of years. As long as the tree from which it is formed remains healthy, the bridge will naturally self-renew and self-strengthen as its component roots grow thicker.

A root bridge can be made in several ways:

=== By hand ===
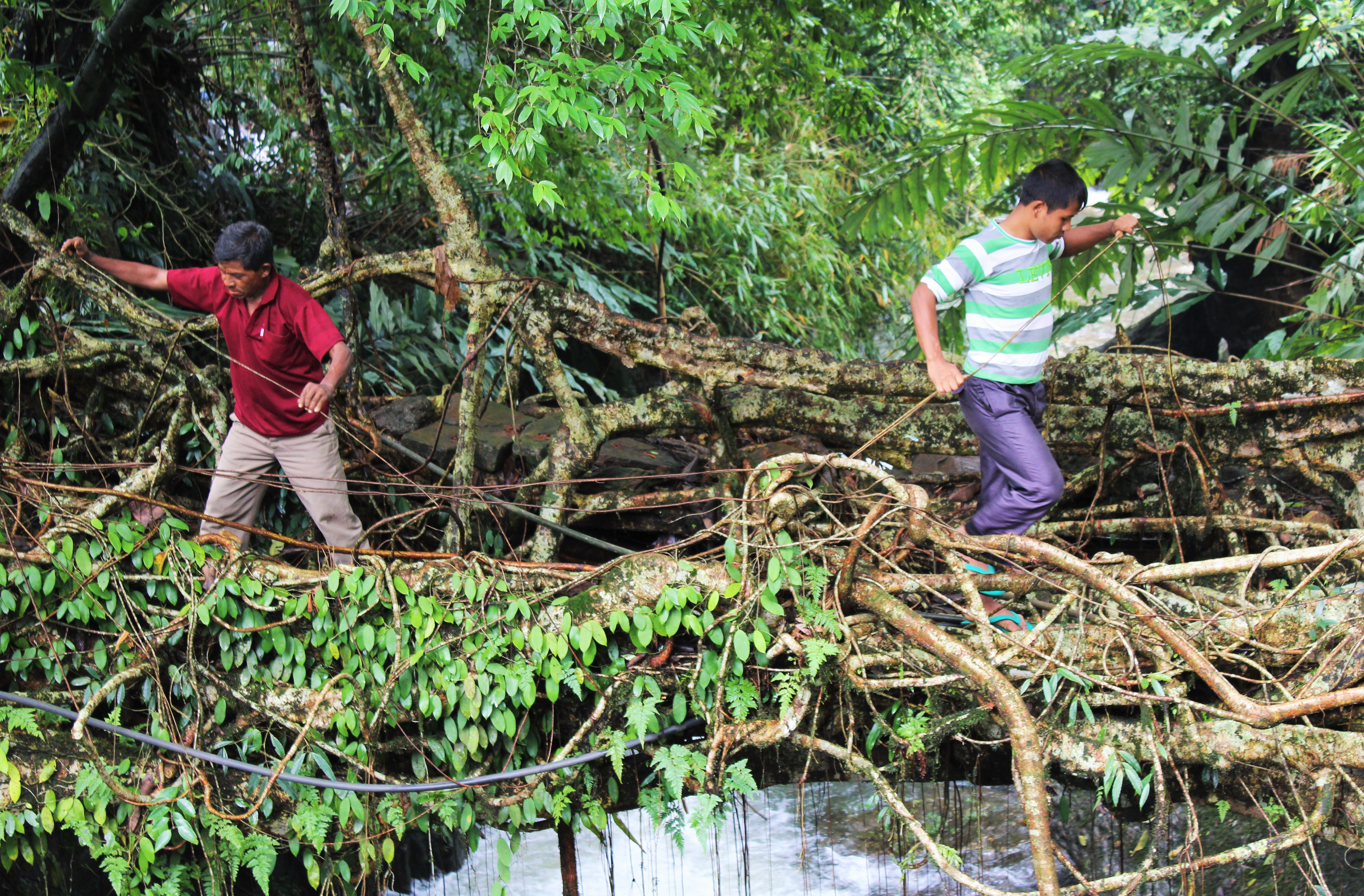
A root bridge in Burma Village, East Khasi Hills, being developed without the aid of a scaffold (2016)

Some living root bridges are created entirely by manipulating the roots of the rubber fig tree by hand, and without the aid of a scaffolding or any other natural or human-made materials.

Often, locals using root bridges will make small alterations to them, manipulating young roots as the opportunity presents itself. Because of this, one can say that the development of a living root bridge is very much a social endeavor and that the structures are perpetual works in progress.

=== Wood or bamboo scaffold ===
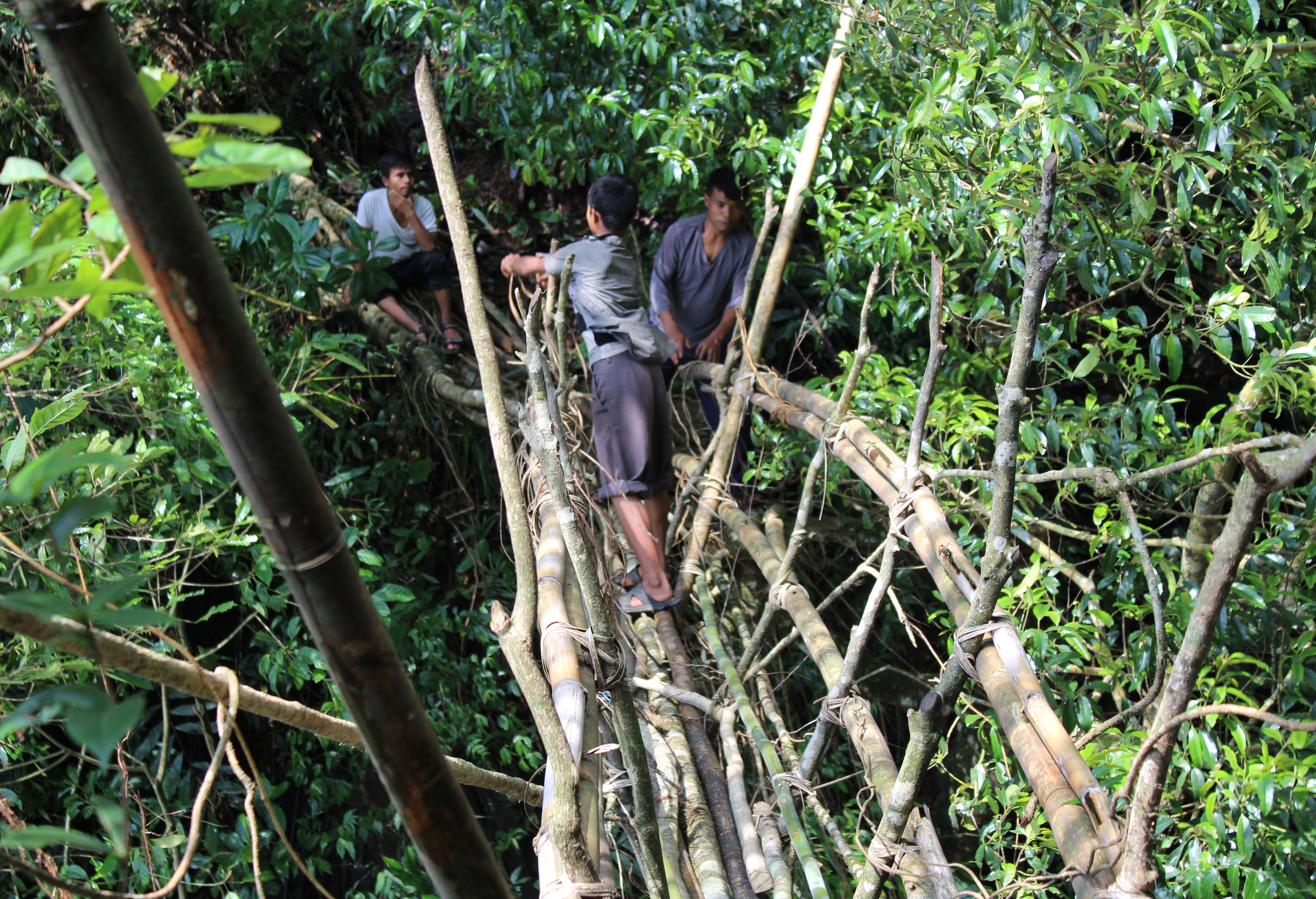
A root bridge being grown using a wood and bamboo scaffold. Rangthylliang, East Khasi Hills (2016)

Root bridges are also commonly formed by training young rubber fig roots over scaffolds made from wood or bamboo, materials which are abundant in Northeast India. In these instances, the roots are wrapped around the outside of the perishable material. The scaffolds may be replaced many times over the years as the root bridge becomes stronger.

=== Areca Palm trunks ===
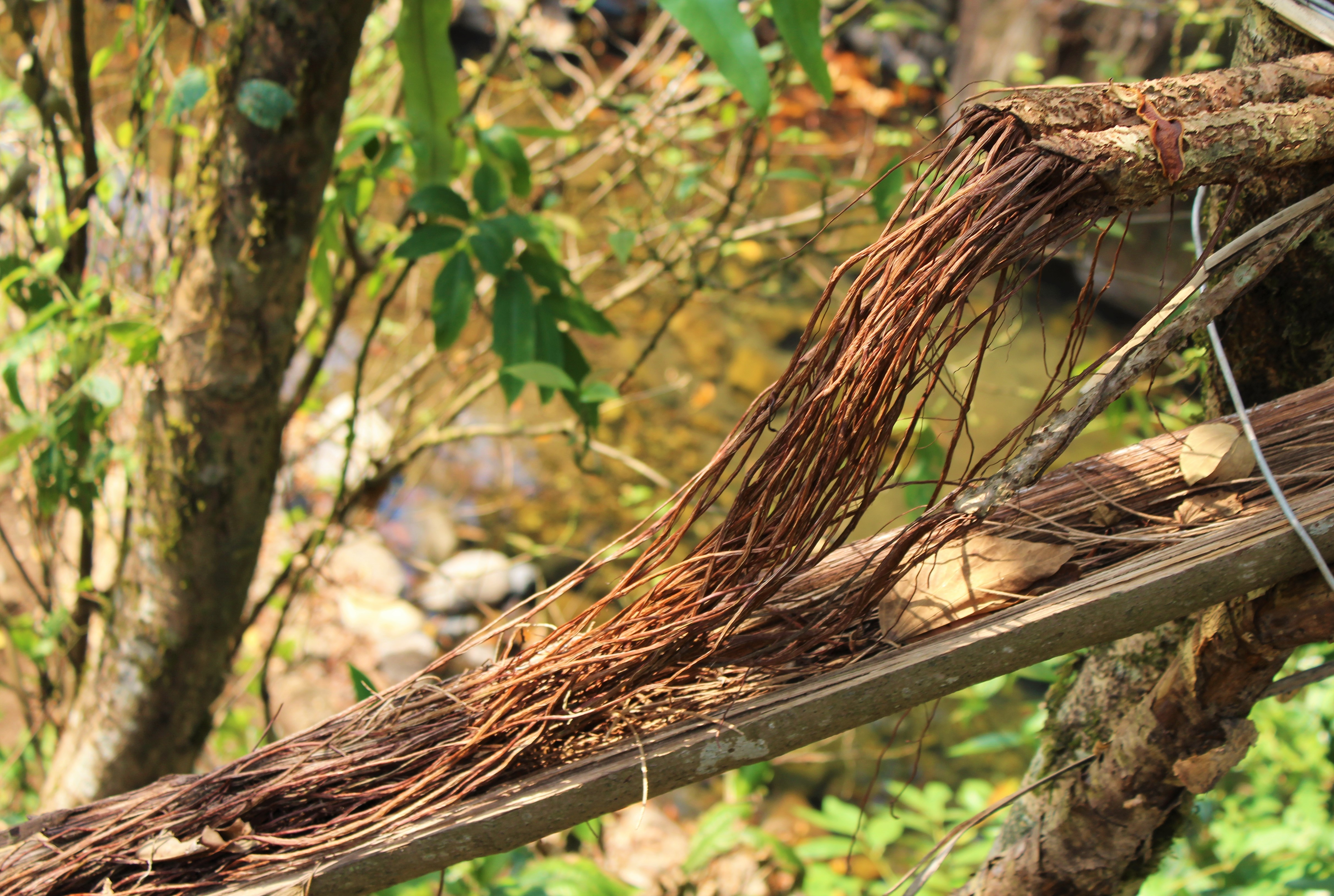
A living root bridge is being developed with rubber fig strands being guided along a halved areca palm trunk (2016)

Some living root bridges are grown by training young rubber fig roots through the hollowed-out trunks of areca nut palms. The pliable tree roots are made to grow through betel tree trunks which have been placed across rivers and streams until the figs' roots attach themselves to the other side. The trunks serve to guide the roots, to protect them, and provide them with nutrients as they decay. Sticks, stones, and other objects are used to stabilize the growing bridge. This process can take up to 15 years to complete.

=== Conventional structures ===
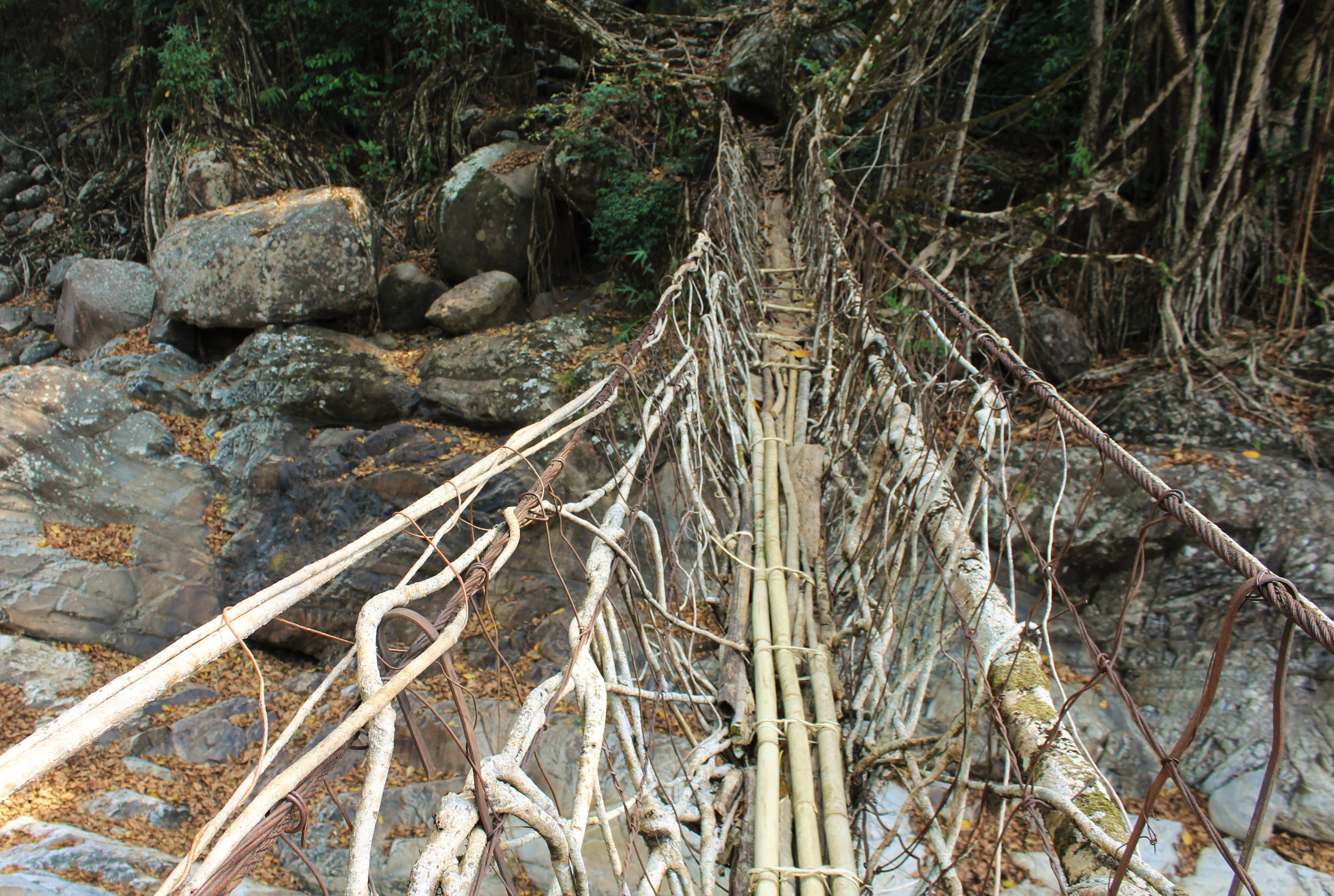
Rubber fig roots have been trained across a pre-existing steel bridge, in the hope that eventually, as the steel elements fail, the roots will form into a usable living root bridge (2016)

Root bridges can also be trained by guiding the young roots of rubber fig trees across conventional structures, such as already existing steel wire suspension bridges. As the structure being used as a scaffold is already functional, the problem of the length of time it takes for a root bridge to become functional is here essentially bypassed; the conventional structure can be used until the more sustainable root bridge is sufficiently strong.

== Distribution ==
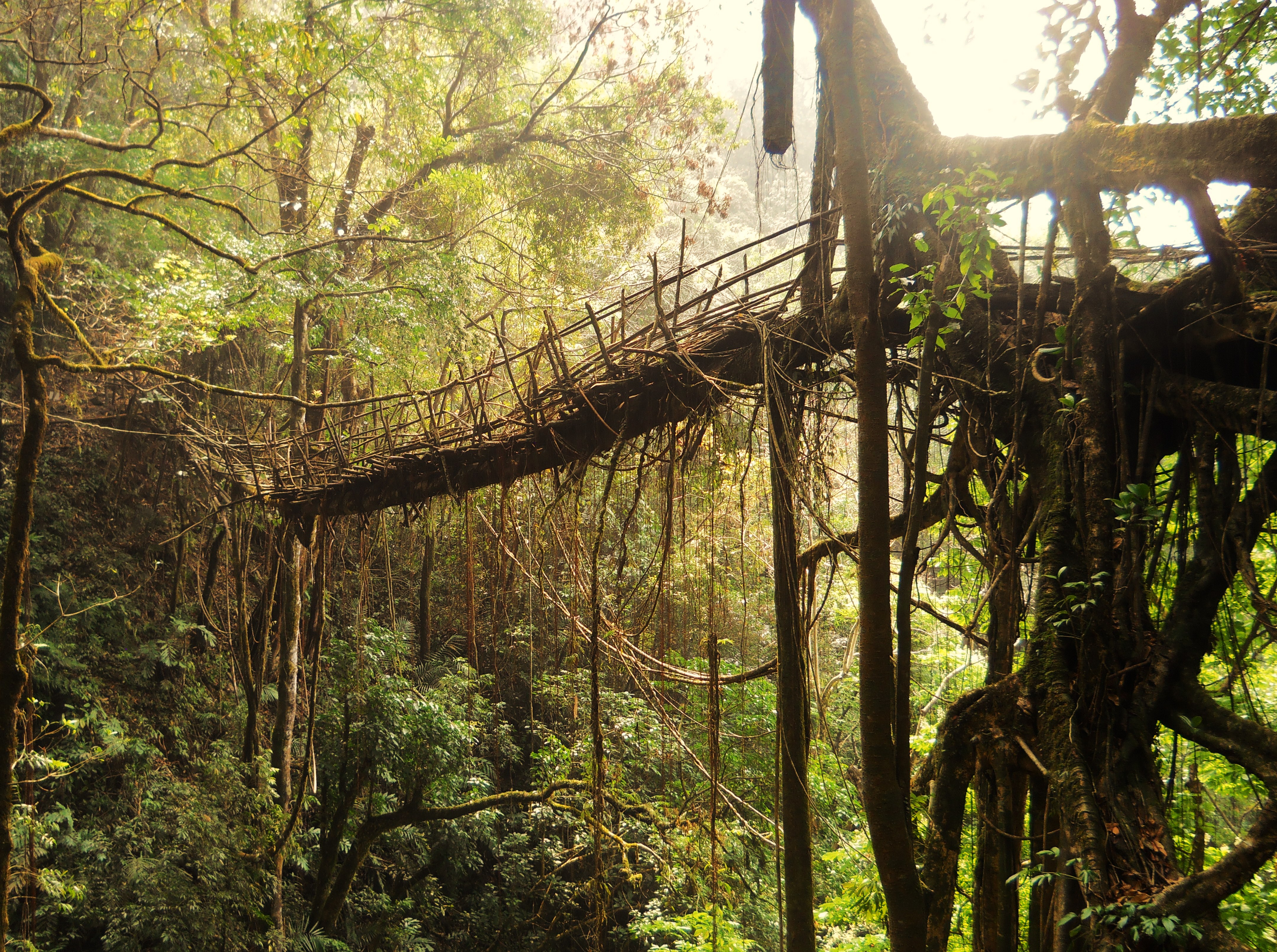
Rangthylliang 1 root bridge, over 50 metres (160 ft) in length, is the longest known example

=== West Jaintia and East Khasi districts ===
Living root bridges are known to occur in the West Jaintia Hills district and East Khasi Hills district. In the Jaintia Hills, examples of living root bridges can be found in and around the villages of Shnongpdeng, Nongbareh, Khonglah, Padu, Kudeng Thymmai, Siej and Kudeng Rim. In the East Khasi Hills, living root bridges nearby Cherrapunji are known to exist in and around the villages of Tynrong, Mynteng, Nongriat, Nongthymmai, and Laitkynsew.

East of Cherrapunji, examples of living root bridges are known to exist in the Khatarshnong region, in and around the villages of Nongpriang, Sohkynduh, Kongthong, Rymmai, and Mawshuit. Many more can be found near the town of Pynursla, including in the villages of Mawkyrnot and Rangthylliangand Mawlynnong.

=== Notable root bridges ===
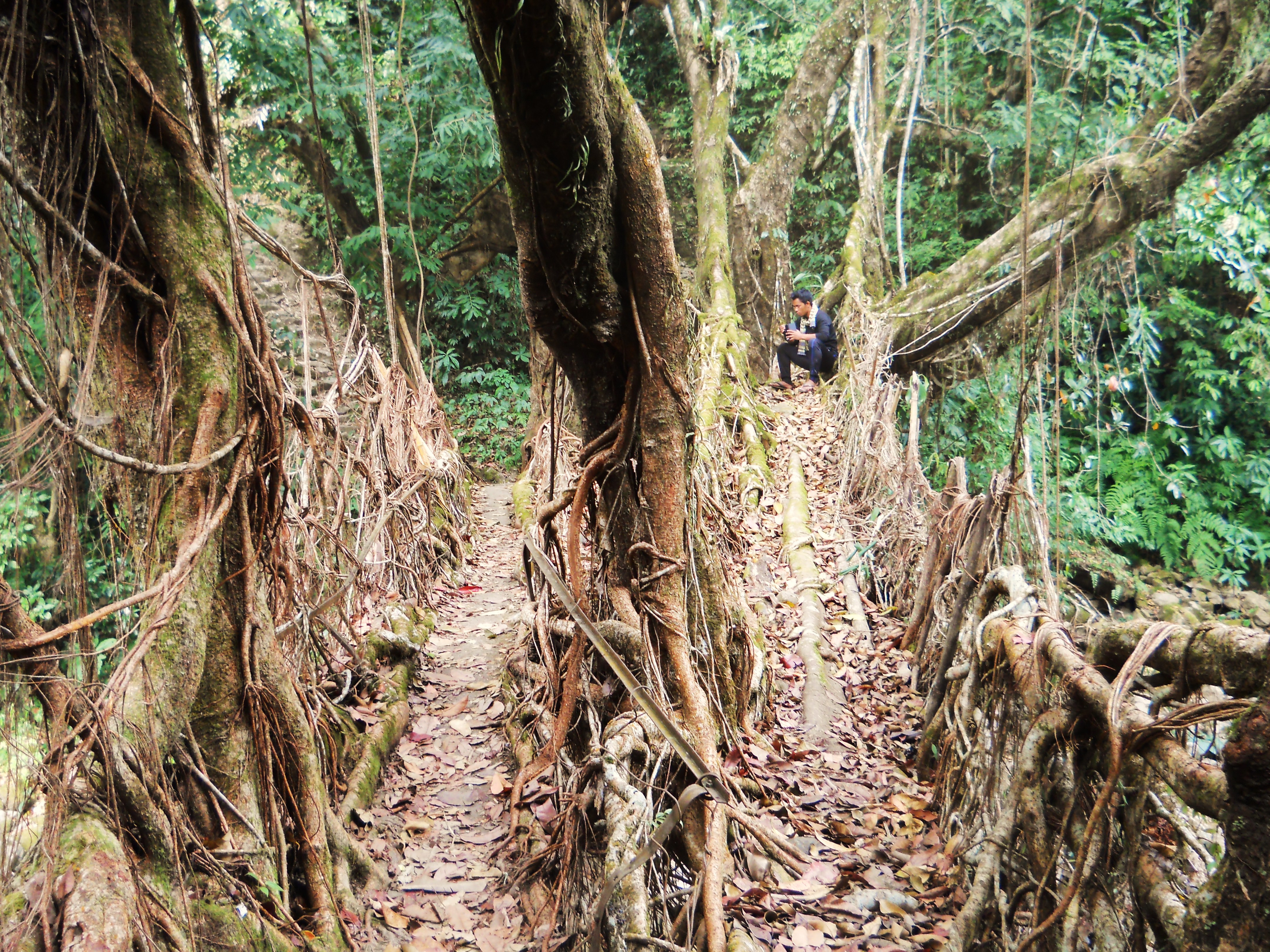
The double-decker two-lane living root bridge of Padu Village (2015)

At over 50 metres (160 ft) in length, the longest known example of a living root bridge is near the small Khasi town of Pynursla in India, which can be accessed from either the village of Mawkyrnot or Rangthylliang. This bridge is known as Rangthylliang bridge.

There are several examples of double living-root bridges, the most famous being the "Double Decker" root bridge of Nongriat which is estimated to be 200 years old. There are three known examples of double-decker bridges with two parallel or nearly parallel spans. Two are in the West Jaintia Hills near the villages of Padu and Nongbareh, and one is in Burma Village, in the East Khasi Hills. There is also a "Double Decker" (or possibly even "Triple Decker") near the village of Rangthylliang, close to Pynursla.

In July 2025, Finance Minister Nirmala Sitharaman visited the iconic living root bridge in Siej village, East Khasi Hills district of Meghalaya, a UNESCO‑recognized ecological marvel. On the occasion, she praised the community, stating:

For over a hundred years, you have maintained a culture that respects nature and fosters sustainable mobility—even finding ways to connect across rivers without violating the living trees.

At a time when the world is searching for sustainable solutions, the people of Siej have shown what is possible through simple, nature‑aligned practices. You have found a way to survive, move, and grow without harming your surroundings. It is extraordinary how local indigenous solutions can serve as global examples.

=== Other root structures ===
The Khasi and Jaiñtia also make several other kinds of structures out of the aerial roots of rubber trees. These include ladders and platforms. For example, in the village of Kudeng Rim in the West Jaintia Hills, a rubber tree next to a football field has been modified so that its branches can serve as living root bleachers. Aerial roots of the tree have been interwoven in the spaces between several branches so that platforms have been created from which villagers can watch football games.

== See also ==
- Baubotanik: Building with both technical joints and plant growth.
- Breathing bridge
- Espalier: Old practice of training fruit trees into flat two-dimensional forms
- Fab Tree Hab: hypothetical home of shaped trees
- List of longest bridges above water in India
- Pleaching: Way of creating a hedge with plants for stock control
- Topiary: The clipping of foliage of perennial plants into clearly defined shapes
