= Don Bosco Technical School, Shillong =

School in India

Coordinates: 25.5693°N 91.8928°E

Information
- Established: 1932; 94 years ago

The Don Bosco Technical School Shillong is a high school established in 1932. It is operated by the Salesians of Don Bosco North East India Guwahati Region.

It offers NCVT courses in 9 trades, and other courses in 13 non formal trades. It is an educational institution of the Catholic Church, belonging to and managed by the Salesians of Don Bosco Educational Society, registered under the Societies Registration Act of 1860 (No.SR/SDB-117/73 of 1973).

== History ==
The Salvatorian missionaries had started a small printing press at Laitkynsew (near Cherapunjee) in 1897. This small printing press was transferred to Shillong in the year 1907. In the same year a few Brothers of the society of the Divine Savior who were experts in carpentry, shoe-making and smithery, began instruction of young Khasi boys in these trades.

Thus began the first trade school in Shillong as part of St. Anthony's school and orphanage. This venture had to be shut down at the departure of the Salvatorians in 1915. The courses that the institution offers are geared towards equipping the youth with some skill in hand to help them to earn a living.

At present the institution offers training in nine NCVT recognized ITI courses – Book Binding, Carpenter, DTP, Electrician, Electronics, Radio and Television, Machinist, Motor Mechanic, Welder, Wireman, and twenty Modular Employable Skills training in the above trades for school drop outs. Besides this, the Institute has courses for Office-assistants, Driving, Computer Hardware and Networking on a regular basis.
