= Myagrus vinosus =

Scientific classification
- Kingdom: Animalia
- Phylum: Arthropoda
- Clade: Pancrustacea
- Class: Insecta
- Order: Coleoptera
- Suborder: Polyphaga
- Infraorder: Cucujiformia
- Family: Cerambycidae
- Genus: Myagrus
- Species: M. vinosus

Binomial name
- Myagrus vinosus (Pascoe, 1866)

Synonyms
- Neopharsalia vagans Kannegieter, 1891; Pharsalia vinosa Pascoe, 1866

Species of beetle

Myagrus vinosus is a species of beetle in the family Cerambycidae. It was described by Francis Polkinghorne Pascoe in 1866, originally under the genus Pharsalia. It is known from Borneo, the Philippines, Malaysia and Sumatra. It feeds on Ficus elastica.
