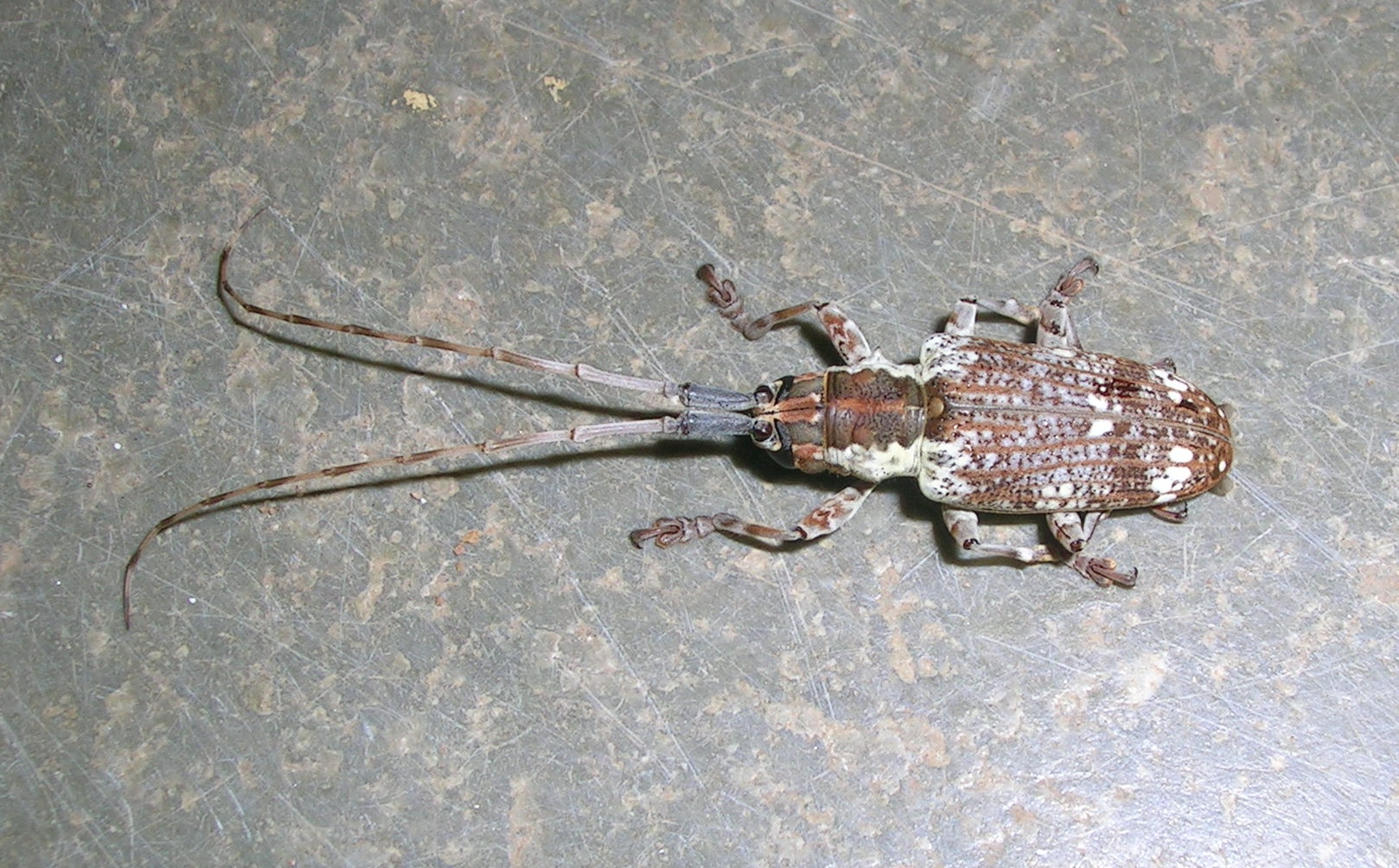
- From the Western Ghats, India

Scientific classification
- Kingdom: Animalia
- Phylum: Arthropoda
- Class: Insecta
- Order: Coleoptera
- Suborder: Polyphaga
- Infraorder: Cucujiformia
- Family: Cerambycidae
- Genus: Myagrus
- Species: M. hynesi

Binomial name
- Myagrus hynesi Pascoe, 1878

Synonyms
- Neopharsalia costeri Neervoort Van De Poll, 1886; Myagrus hynesi Pascoe, 1878 (misspelling)

= Myagrus hynesi =

Species of beetle

Myagrus hynesi is a species of beetle in the family Cerambycidae, and the type species of its genus. It was described by Francis Polkinghorne Pascoe in 1878. It is known from Borneo, India, Sumatra and Malaysia.
