= Myagrus irroratus =

Scientific classification
- Domain: Eukaryota
- Kingdom: Animalia
- Phylum: Arthropoda
- Class: Insecta
- Order: Coleoptera
- Suborder: Polyphaga
- Infraorder: Cucujiformia
- Family: Cerambycidae
- Tribe: Lamiini
- Genus: Myagrus
- Species: M. irroratus

Binomial name
- Myagrus irroratus (Heller, 1924)

Synonyms
- Myagrus irroratus (Heller, 1924); Paradiallus ochreostictus Breuning, 1950; Paraxoes semperi Breuning, 1958; Xoes? irroratus Heller, 1924

Species of beetle

Myagrus irroratus is a species of beetle in the family Cerambycidae, and the type species of its genus. It was described by Heller in 1924, originally under the genus Xoes. It is known from the Philippines.
