= Breathing bridge =

Bridge made from tree roots

A breathing bridge is a type of living root bridge handmade from the aerial roots of banyan trees from the region of Amazonas (Peru).

For centuries, Nukak Makú indigenous tribes have been training the roots of these trees to cross streams that spontaneously appear during the wet season. They first grow the trees along the river banks and after ten years when the roots are big enough they start assembling the bridge. Such a long-term project cannot be completed in a lifetime, so the knowledge is passed over generations. Some of these bridges will live for 500 years spanning over 100 feet (30 meters).

== See also ==
- Umshiang Double-Decker Root Bridge
