= Rangthylliang 1 root bridge =

Living root bridge in Cherrapunji, India

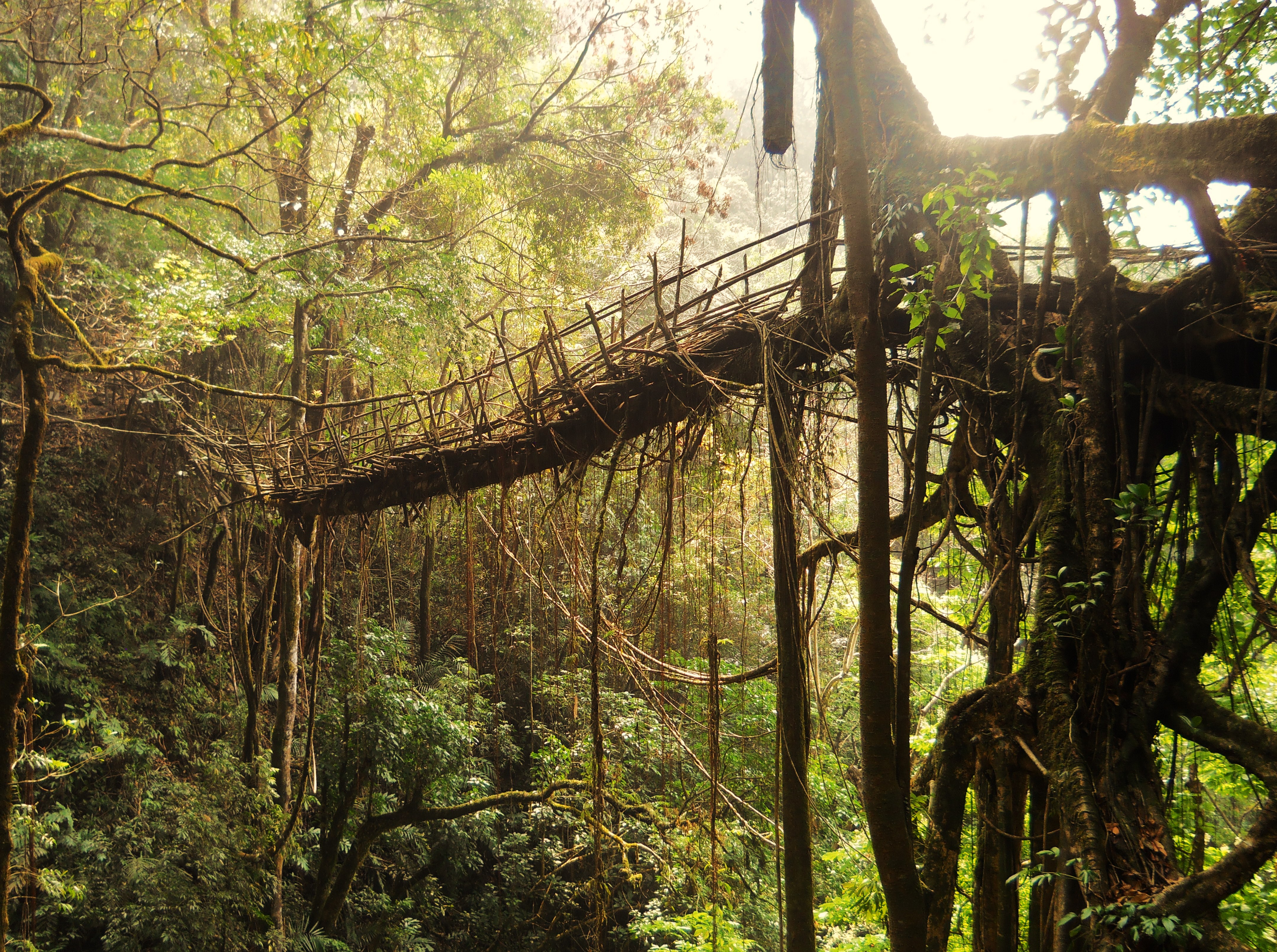
Rangthylliang 1 root bridge

Rangthylliang 1 root bridge is a living root bridge in Cherrapunji region, Meghalaya, northeast India. It is considered to be the longest living root bridge, at over 50 metres (160 ft) in length. The bridge, named after the village of Rangthylliang, where various other root bridges can also be found, is situated 30 metres (98 ft) above the ground. The trek for visiting the living root bridges starts in Rangthylliang and ends in Mawkyrnot village.
