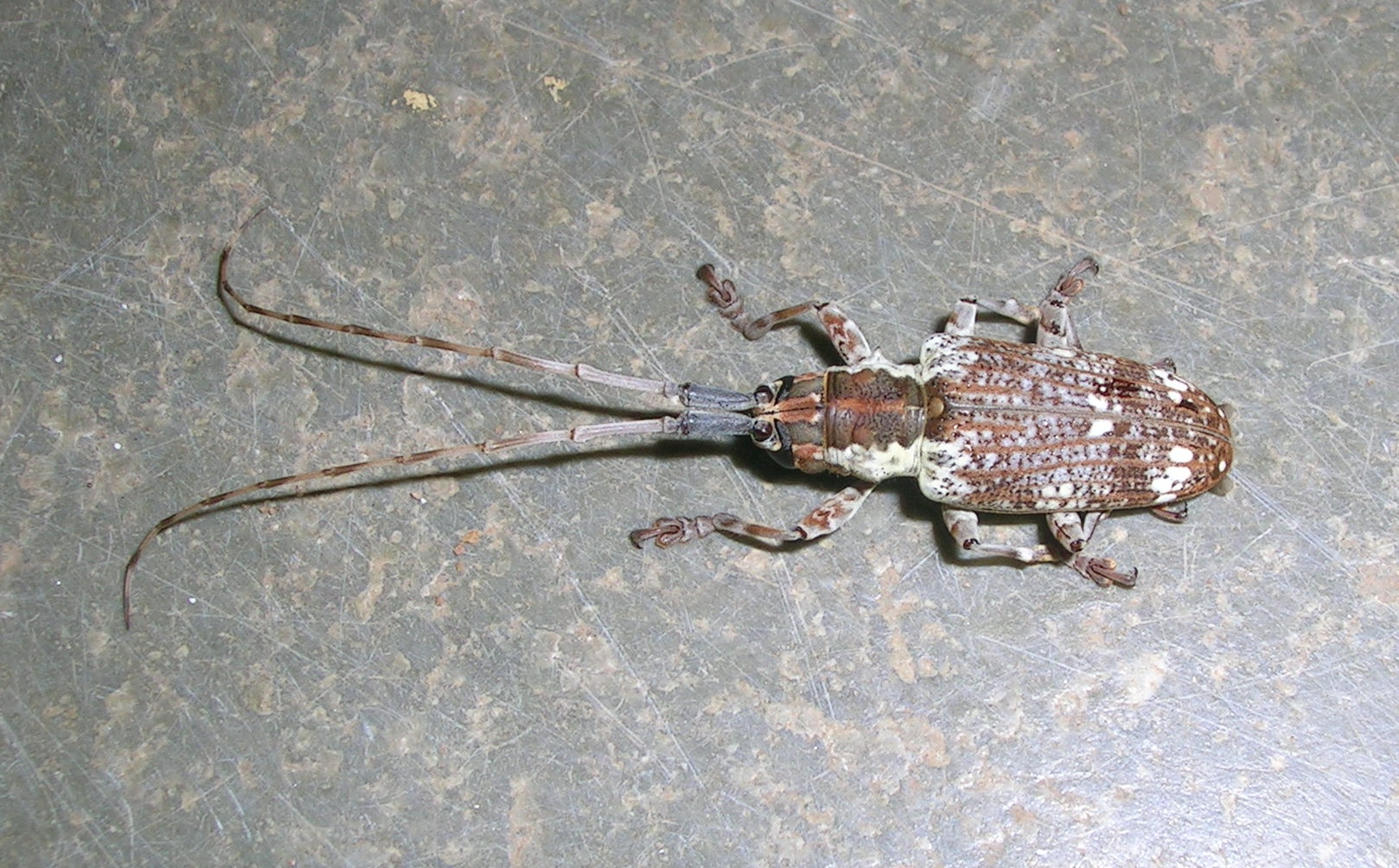
- Myagrus hynesi

Scientific classification
- Domain: Eukaryota
- Kingdom: Animalia
- Phylum: Arthropoda
- Class: Insecta
- Order: Coleoptera
- Suborder: Polyphaga
- Infraorder: Cucujiformia
- Family: Cerambycidae
- Subfamily: Lamiinae
- Tribe: Lamiini
- Genus: Myagrus; Pascoe, 1878

= Myagrus =

Genus of beetles

Myagrus is a genus of longhorn beetles of the subfamily Lamiinae, containing the following species:

- Myagrus alboplagiatus (Gahan, 1888)
- Myagrus hynesi Pascoe, 1878
- Myagrus irroratus (Heller, 1924)
- Myagrus javanicus Breuning, 1957
- Myagrus vinosus (Pascoe, 1866)
