= Nongriat =

- village
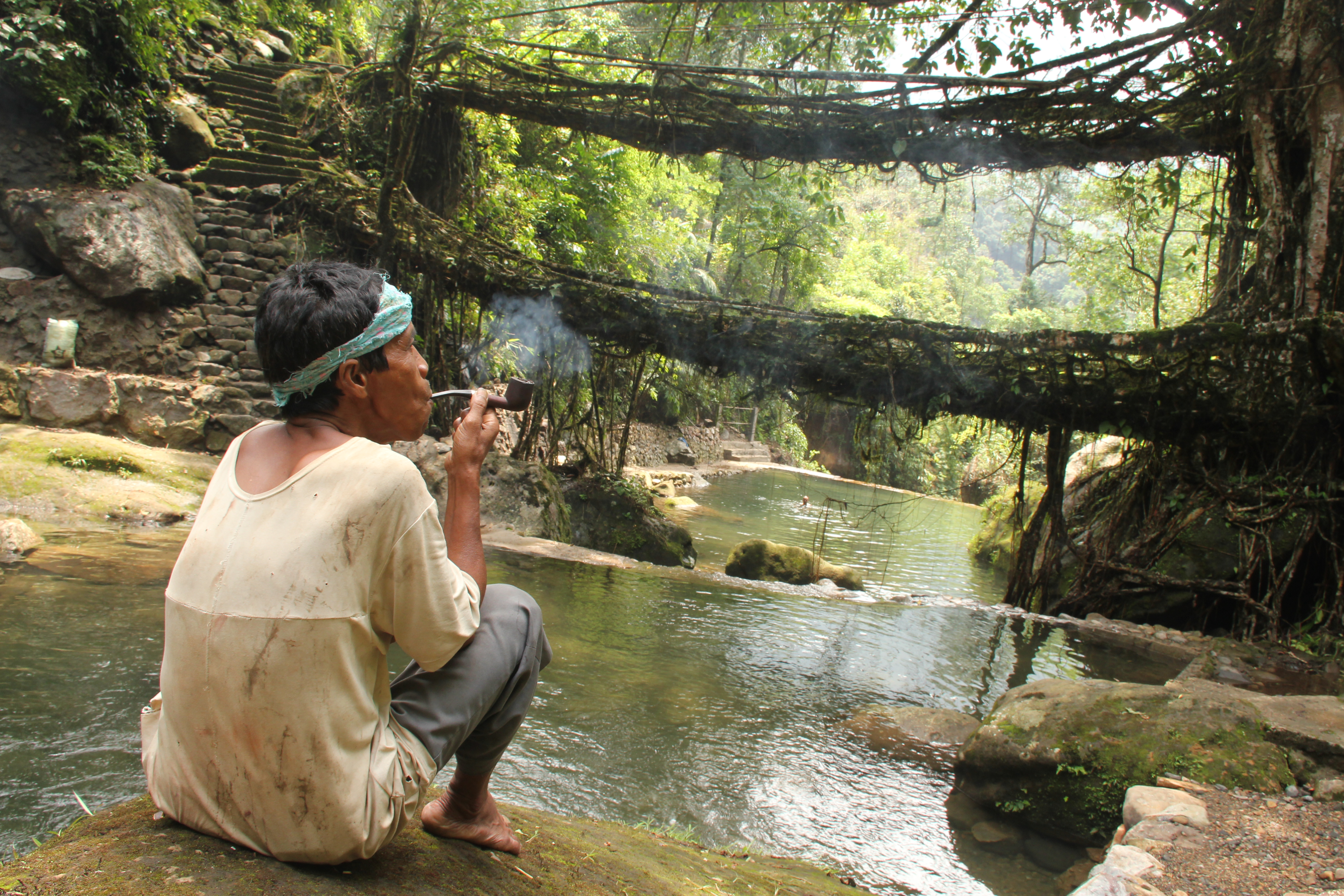
- Nongriat's most famous living root bridge
- Interactive map of Nongriat
- Country: India
- State: Meghalaya
- District: East Khasi Hills

Languages
  - Official: English
- Time zone: UTC+5:30 (IST)
- Vehicle registration: ML
- Nearest city: Shillong
- Entry will be closed on Sundays

Nongriat is a village in the East Khasi Hills district of Meghalaya State, in north-eastern India.

Nongriat is perhaps best known for its living root bridges; one an impressive double-decker suspension bridge called Jingkieng Nongriat. The village has three functional root bridges. These roots crafted by hand in to bridges, as the Khasi people have done in the Khasi Hills for centuries, intertwining and weaving together the aerial roots of banyan trees on opposite sides of a stream-filled gorge.

Jingkieng Nongriat, better known simply as Double Decker, has been featured on international television programs such as the Human Planet series filmed in 2008 by BBC Wales, and a documentary by Osamu Monden in June 2004 for Asahi TV in Japan.

There is another functioning living root bridge upstream from Nongriat, along with a hybrid structure that is made from both roots and steel wire.

Near Nongriat, and best viewed from the neighboring village of Laitkynsew during the autumn monsoon season as a magnificent cascade, is the waterfall of Ka Likai. A succession of stone steps connect the community with neighboring village of Tyrna, just below the Cherrapunji-Laitkynsew bridle-path.

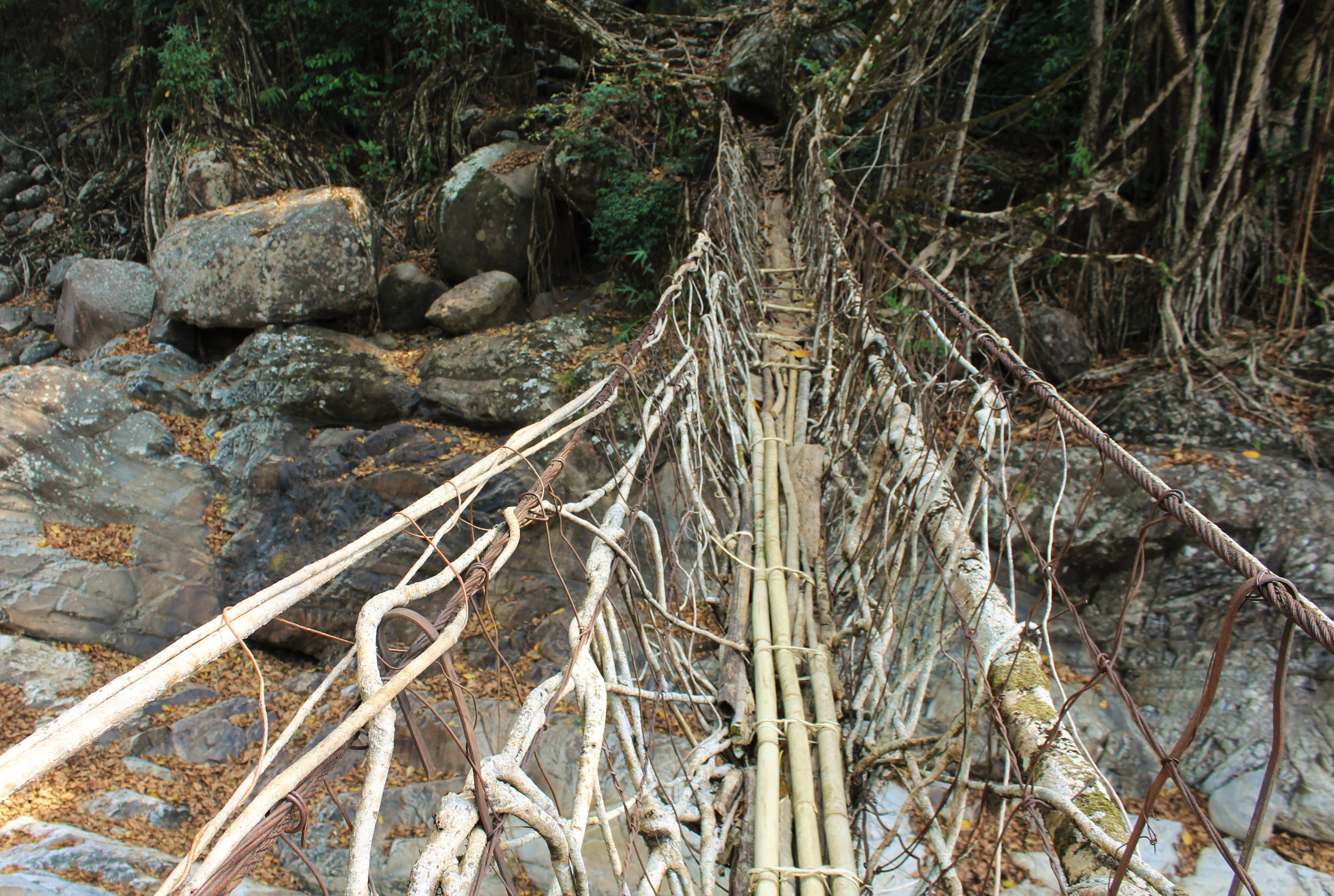
The hybrid bridge of Nongriat

== Climate ==
Climate data for Nongriat, 1981–2010 normals
| Month | Jan | Feb | Mar | Apr | May | Jun | Jul | Aug | Sep | Oct | Nov | Dec | Year |
|---|---|---|---|---|---|---|---|---|---|---|---|---|---|
| Mean daily maximum °C (°F) | 21 (70) | 23 (73) | 27 (81) | 27 (81) | 27 (81) | 27 (81) | 27 (81) | 28 (82) | 28 (82) | 27 (81) | 25 (77) | 22 (72) | 26 (79) |
| Mean daily minimum °C (°F) | 9 (48) | 11 (52) | 15 (59) | 17 (63) | 19 (66) | 21 (70) | 21 (70) | 21 (70) | 21 (70) | 19 (66) | 14 (57) | 11 (52) | 17 (62) |
| Average precipitation mm (inches) | 16.9 (0.67) | 62.1 (2.44) | 255.2 (10.05) | 633.7 (24.95) | 1,075.2 (42.33) | 2,048.3 (80.64) | 2,429.9 (95.67) | 1,561 (61.46) | 1,004.4 (39.54) | 344.8 (13.57) | 48.0 (1.89) | 18.2 (0.72) | 9,497.7 (373.93) |
Source: Chelsa Climate
