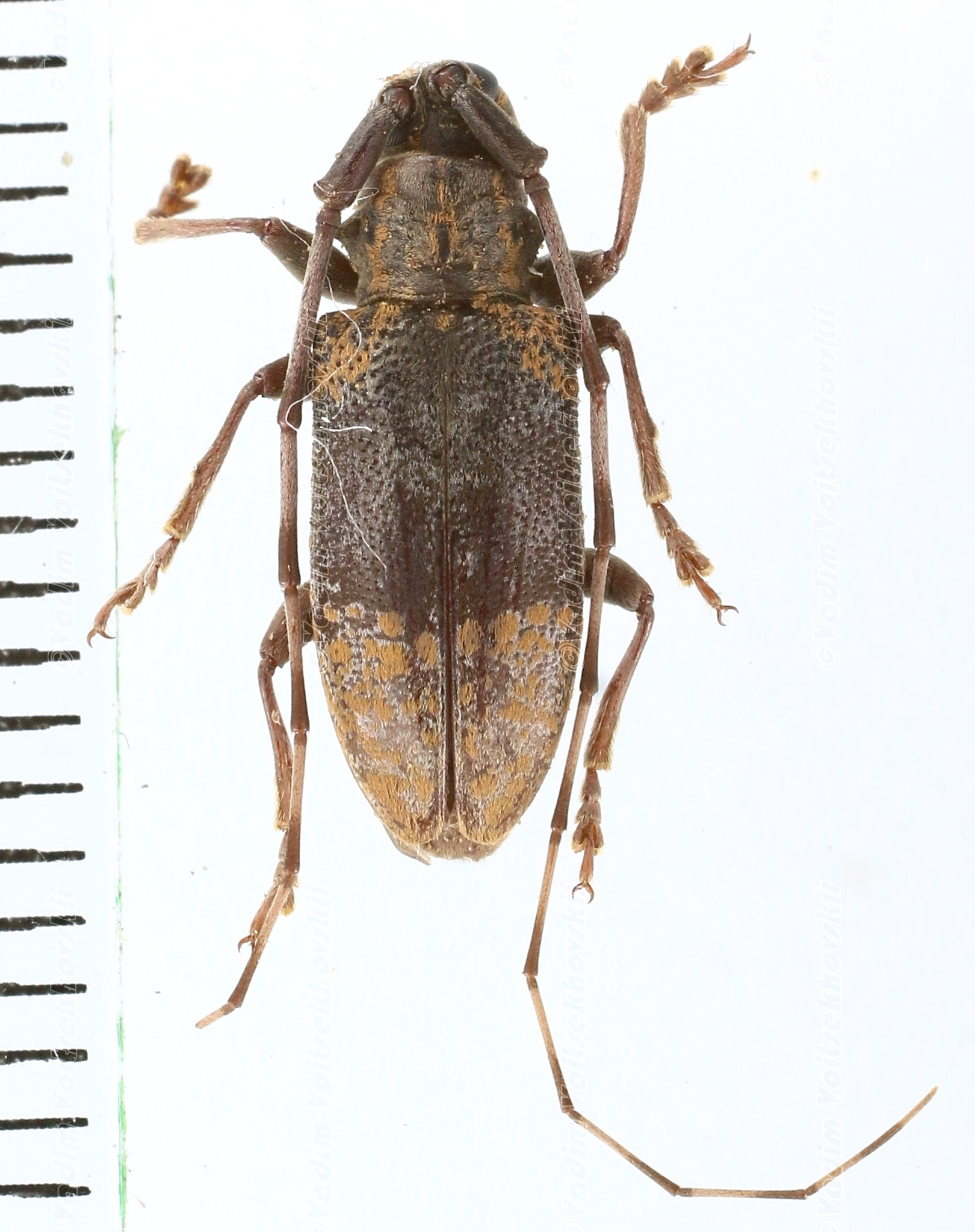

Scientific classification
- Kingdom: Animalia
- Phylum: Arthropoda
- Clade: Pancrustacea
- Class: Insecta
- Order: Coleoptera
- Suborder: Polyphaga
- Infraorder: Cucujiformia
- Family: Cerambycidae
- Genus: Myagrus
- Species: M. javanicus

Binomial name
- Myagrus javanicus Breuning, 1957

= Myagrus javanicus =

Species of beetle

Myagrus javanicus is a species of beetle in the family Cerambycidae. It was described by Stephan von Breuning in 1957. It is known from Java.
