= Myagrus alboplagiatus =

Scientific classification
- Kingdom: Animalia
- Phylum: Arthropoda
- Class: Insecta
- Order: Coleoptera
- Suborder: Polyphaga
- Infraorder: Cucujiformia
- Family: Cerambycidae
- Genus: Myagrus
- Species: M. alboplagiatus

Binomial name
- Myagrus alboplagiatus (Gahan, 1888)

Synonyms
- Pharsalia alboplagiata Gahan, 1888

Species of beetle

Myagrus alboplagiatus is a species of beetle in the family Cerambycidae. It was described by Charles Joseph Gahan in 1888. It is known from Borneo.
