= Ferdinand Ludwig =

German architect and academic researcher

Ferdinand Ludwig is a German architect and the head of the professorship for Green Technologies in Landscape Architecture at the Technical University of Munich. Ludwig is a pioneer of and innovator in the field of Baubotanik, the architectural realm of living plant construction.

== Academic career and research areas ==
Ludwig began as an architecture student and graduated from the University of Stuttgart in 2012 with a dissertation titled “The Botanical Fundamentals of Baubotanik and their Application in Design”. In 2005 he along with Hannes Schwertfeger and Oliver Storz build planting they referred to as “Baubotanik buildings” In 2007, he co-founded the research group “Baubotanik” at the University of Stuttgart's Institute of Architectural Theory and Design (IGMA) and served as a head research associate until 2017. Along with Daniel Schönle in 2010, Ludwig created “ludwig.schönle: Baubotanik - Architecture - Urbanism”, a collaborative office centering on incorporating the baubotanik approach in urban planning and architectural design. Ludwig has designed and created numerous Baubotanik projects around Germany, such as the Plane-Tree-Cube in Nagold in 2012, a Baubotanik Tower in 2009, and a Baubotanik Footbridge in 2005.

The central focus of Ludwig's research concerns integrating the growth processes of living plants into architectural design and construction. The plan is to build a structure suitable to guide the trees growth into the desired form. Merging living plants with architectural construction allows for the exploration of the creative and functional uses of plants in the context of building engineering. The concept of Baubotanik is not only relevant in the fields of architecture and landscape architecture, but has increasingly been recognized as an adaptation method to climate change. Ludwig's work additionally centers on the technical challenges that arise in Baubotanik, thereby broadening architectural knowledge by confronting aspects of growth and decay, and probability and chance in architectural design.

== Awards ==
- Prize for bold science, Ministry of Science, Research and the Arts of the State of Baden-Württemberg (2016)
- Prize for exceptional scientific achievements, University of Stuttgart (2013)
- Named a “Maker of Tomorrow” by the Minister of the Environment, Climate Protection and the Energy Sector Baden-Württemberg (2012)
- The Plane-Tree-Cube in Nagold was given the “Special Prize for Innovation” at “Holzbaupreis Baden-Württemberg 2012.”

== Key publications ==
- Ludwig F: “Baubotanik: Designing with living material.” In: Materiality in Architecture. Editor: Löschke S. New York: Routledge, 2016: 182–190. Abstract
- Ludwig F, Schönle D, Bellers M: „Klimaaktive baubotanische Stadtquartiere, Bautypologien und Infrastrukturen: Modellprojekte und Planungswerkzeuge“. Reihe KLIMOPASS-Berichte: KLIMOPASS – Klimawandel und modellhafte Anpassung in Baden-Württemberg. Teil 2 Angewandte Forschung und Modellprojekte. LUBW. 2015. PDF download
- Ludwig F, Storz O, Schwertfeger H: „Living Systems. Designing Growth in Baubotanik”. Architectural Design Journal. 2012; 82(2): 82–87. Abstract
- Ludwig F: “Baubotanik Tower / Lake Constance Footbridge” In: Biodesign. Nature – Science – Creativity. Museum of Modern Architecture. Editor: Myers W. New York: Thames & Hudson Ltd, 2012: 36–41. Abstract
- Ludwig F, de Bruyn G, Thielen M, Speck T: “Plant stems as building material for living plant constructions”. Proceedings of the 6th Plant Biomechanics Conference. Cayenne, French Guiana, France. November 16–21, 2009: 398–405.

See Publications for all publications.
