= Jembatan akar =

Living root bridge in West Sumatra, Indonesia

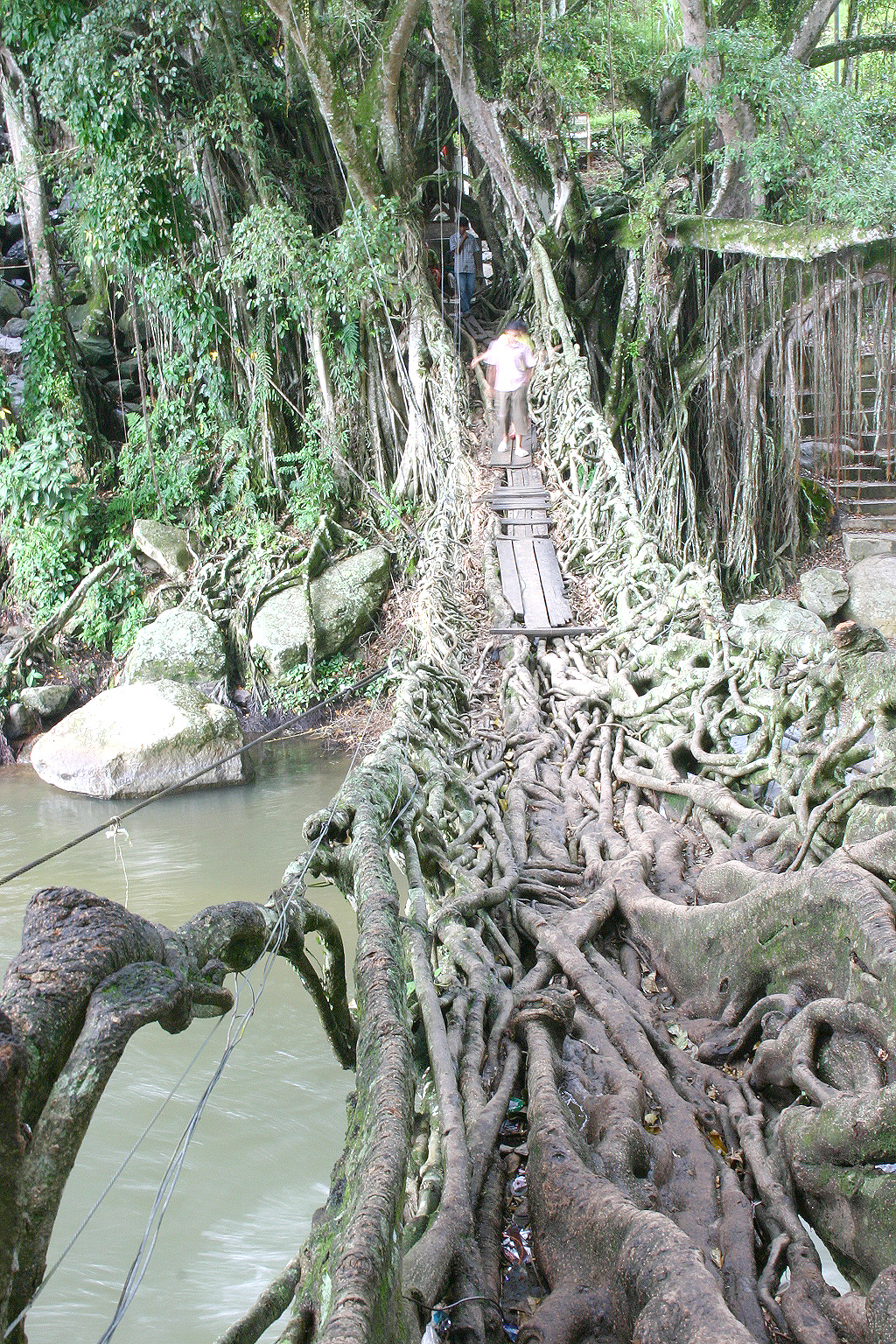
Jembatan akar, a tourist attraction in Pesisir Selatan

Jembatan akar (English: living root bridge) is a bridge formed from the roots of two trees that extends over a stream in the subdistrict Bayang Utara, Pesisir Selatan Regency, West Sumatra, Indonesia. It is located about 88 km south of the city of Padang. In the language of Minang, the bridge is the community outreach called titian aka.

This bridge has a length of 25 metres (82 ft) and a width of 1.5 metres (4 ft 11 in) with a height from the surface of the river of about 3 metres (9.8 ft). It began to be formed in 1890 and could be used in 1916. In other words, the process of knitting a root bridge takes approximately 26 years. Currently, conditions are becoming increasingly stronger with the size of the roots of the banyan tree that formed it. On any day of the week and national holidays, the tourist attraction root bridge is much visited by local tourists and foreign tourists.
