= Khonglah =

Khonglah is a place in Meghalaya, north-eastern India, as well as the name of a War-speaking Jaintia clan.
