= Nongthymmai =

- Census town
- Location in Meghalaya, India Nongthymmai (India)
- Coordinates: 25.5637265°N 91.9064283°E
- Country: India
- State: Meghalaya
- District: East Khasi Hills

Population (2001)
  - Total: 34,209

Languages
  - Official: Khasi, English
- Time zone: UTC+5:30 (IST)
- Vehicle registration: ML

Nongthymmai is a census town in East Khasi Hills district in the Indian state of Meghalaya.

== Demographics ==
According to the 2001 India census, Nongthymmai had a population of 34,209. Males constituted 50% of the population and females 50%. Nongthymmai had an average literacy rate of 82%, higher than the national average of 59.5%: male literacy was 84% and female literacy 80%. 11% of the population were under 6 years of age.

The name of this small village comes from two words in the Khasi dialect, "nong" meaning "village" and "thymmai" meaning "new", so literally translated it means "the new village".

== Education ==
=== Colleges ===
- Ïaikyntiew College
- Morning Star College
- St. Dominic's College
