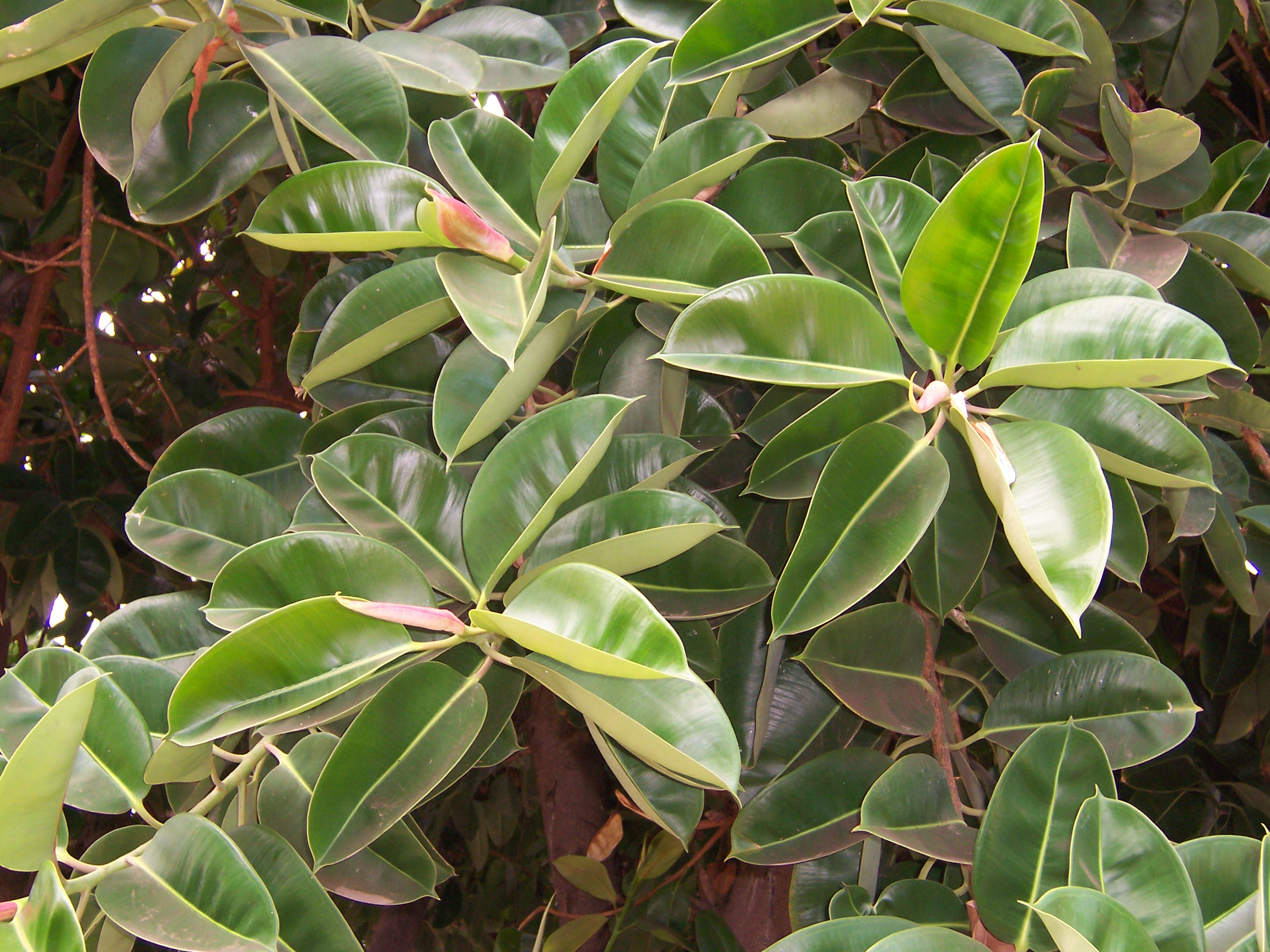

Conservation status
- Least Concern (IUCN 3.1)

Scientific classification
- Kingdom: Plantae
- Clade: Embryophytes
- Clade: Tracheophytes
- Clade: Angiosperms
- Clade: Eudicots
- Clade: Rosids
- Order: Rosales
- Family: Moraceae
- Genus: Ficus
- Subgenus: F. subg. Urostigma
- Species: F. elastica

Binomial name
- Ficus elastica Roxb. ex Hornem. – not Roxb. 1832, nor Roxb. 1814 (the latter not validly published)

Synonyms
- List: Stilpnophyllum elasticum (Roxb. ex Hornem.) Drury; Urostigma elasticum (Roxb. ex Hornem.) Miq.; Visiania elastica (Roxb. ex Hornem.) Gasp.; Macrophthalma elastica (Roxb. ex Hornem.) Gasp.; Ficus karet (Miq.) King; Ficus skytinodermis Summerh.; Ficus taeda Kunth & C.D.Bouché; Urostigma circumscissum Miq.; Urostigma karet Miq.; Urostigma odoratum Miq.

= Ficus elastica =

Rubber fig

Species of banyan tree

Ficus elastica, the rubber fig, rubber bush, rubber tree, rubber plant, or Indian rubber bush, Indian rubber tree, or rambung is a species of flowering plant in the family Moraceae, native to eastern parts of South and Southeast Asia. Its common names reflect its historical use as a source of rubber within its native range, but it is not used in the modern commercial-scale production of natural rubber.

== Description ==
Ficus elastica is a large tree in the banyan group of figs, growing to 30–40 m (100–130 ft) – rarely up to 60 m or 195 ft – tall, with a stout trunk up to 2 m (6 ft 7 in) in diameter. The trunk develops aerial and buttressing roots to anchor it in the soil and help support heavy branches.

It has broad shiny oval leaves 10–35 cm (4–14 in) long and 5–15 cm (2–6 in) broad; leaf size is largest on young plants (occasionally up to 45 cm or 17 1/2 in long), much smaller on old trees (typically 10 cm or 4 in long). The leaves develop inside a sheath at the apical meristem, which grows larger as the new leaf develops. When it is mature, it unfurls and the sheath drops off the plant. Inside the new leaf, another immature leaf is waiting to develop. The canopy of the tree is dense.

== Pollination and fruiting ==
As with other members of the genus Ficus, the flowers require a particular species of fig wasp to pollinate it in a co-evolved relationship. These wasps enter receptive female flowers by way of the osteole, and deposit their eggs in the female flowers, resulting in pollination.

Because of this relationship, the rubber plant does not produce highly colourful or fragrant flowers to attract other pollinators. The fruit is a small yellow-green oval fig 1 cm (1/2 in) long, barely edible; these are fake fruits that contain fertile seeds only in areas where the pollinating insect is present.

== Range ==
The natural range of F. elastica extends from Nepal in the north to Indonesia, Bhutan, Northeastern India, Bangladesh, Myanmar, Thailand, Yunnan in China, and Malaysia. It has been widely introduced in most tropical regions of the world, including in the Americas. In Europe it can be found in mild locations throughout the Mediterranean Basin. In the Near East, it is a common landscaping element on the streets of Tel Aviv, Israel.

== Cultivation ==
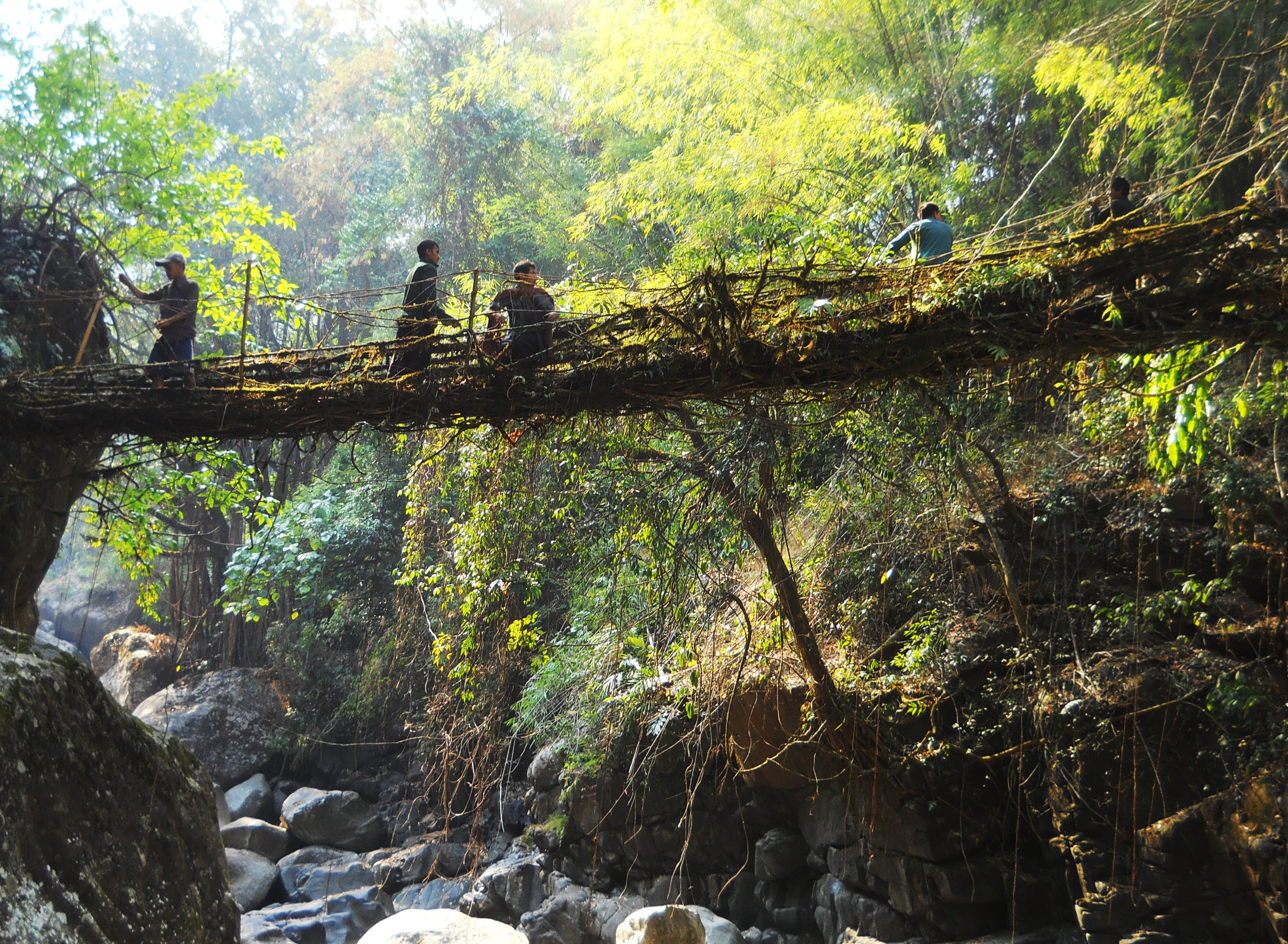
Aerial roots of Ficus elastica being formed into a bridge in Meghalaya, India

In parts of India, people guide the roots of the tree over chasms to eventually form living bridges. To this day there are large bridges woven from aerial roots in Meghalaya, India. Although the trees used for these bridges are very large, aerial roots can be found on F. elastica as small as 1 feet tall.

== Use and production ==
Medicinal and nutritional usage of F. elastica: a distillation of the plant's aerial rootlets can be used to make a poultice for healing wounds, while the tips of the leaves, when young, can be used as salad greens. Small versions of the trees can be grown as houseplants. F. elastica was once thought to improve indoor air quality when placed in the home; however, though F. elastica does remove 1 microgram per hour of formaldehyde from the air, these results are not applicable to typical buildings, where outdoor-to-indoor air exchange already removes volatile organic compounds (VOCs) at a rate that could only be matched by the placement of 10–1000 plants/m^{2} of a building's floor space.

=== Latex ===
All parts of the plant contain an abundant milky white latex, a chemical compound separate from its sap and carried and stored in different cells. The latex of F. elastica can irritate the eyes and skin, and is toxic if ingested. Its sap can be used to make rubber; it was once the most common plant in Sumatra and Malay Peninsula for tapping before the Pará tree (Hevea brasiliensis) was introduced from Brazil in the late 1800s, and became the popular industrial cultivar thereafter. F. elastica (known as Rambung trees) were very valuable to farmers in Aceh in Indonesia, who found them in their newly cleared lands. The latex of F. elastica has been tested for use in the manufacture of modern rubber, but without economic and technical results, due to the complications of tapping it, and its inferior yield when compared to Hevea brasiliensis.

=== Ornamental ===
F. elastica is grown around the world as an ornamental plant. It can be grown outside in frost-free climates ranging from tropical climates to the Mediterranean, and grown inside in colder climates as a houseplant. It is tolerant of light frosts, and thrives in USDA hardiness zones 10–12. Although it is grown in Hawaii, the fig wasp species required for natural reproduction is not present there.

In cultivation, it prefers bright sunlight but not hot temperatures. It has a high tolerance for drought, but prefers humidity and thrives in wet, tropical conditions. Ornamental hybrids (such as 'Robusta') have been derived from Fil. elastica with broader, stiffer and more upright leaves than the wild form. Many such hybrids exist, often with variegated leaves.

Most cultivated plants are produced by vegetative propagation. This can be done by cuttings or by layering.

== Gallery ==
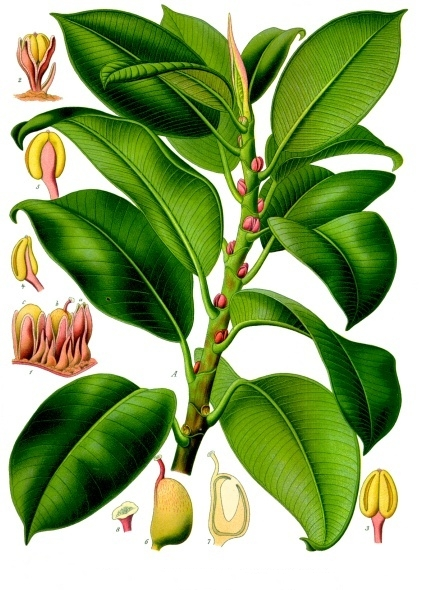
Illustration from Köhler's Medicinal Plants (1887)

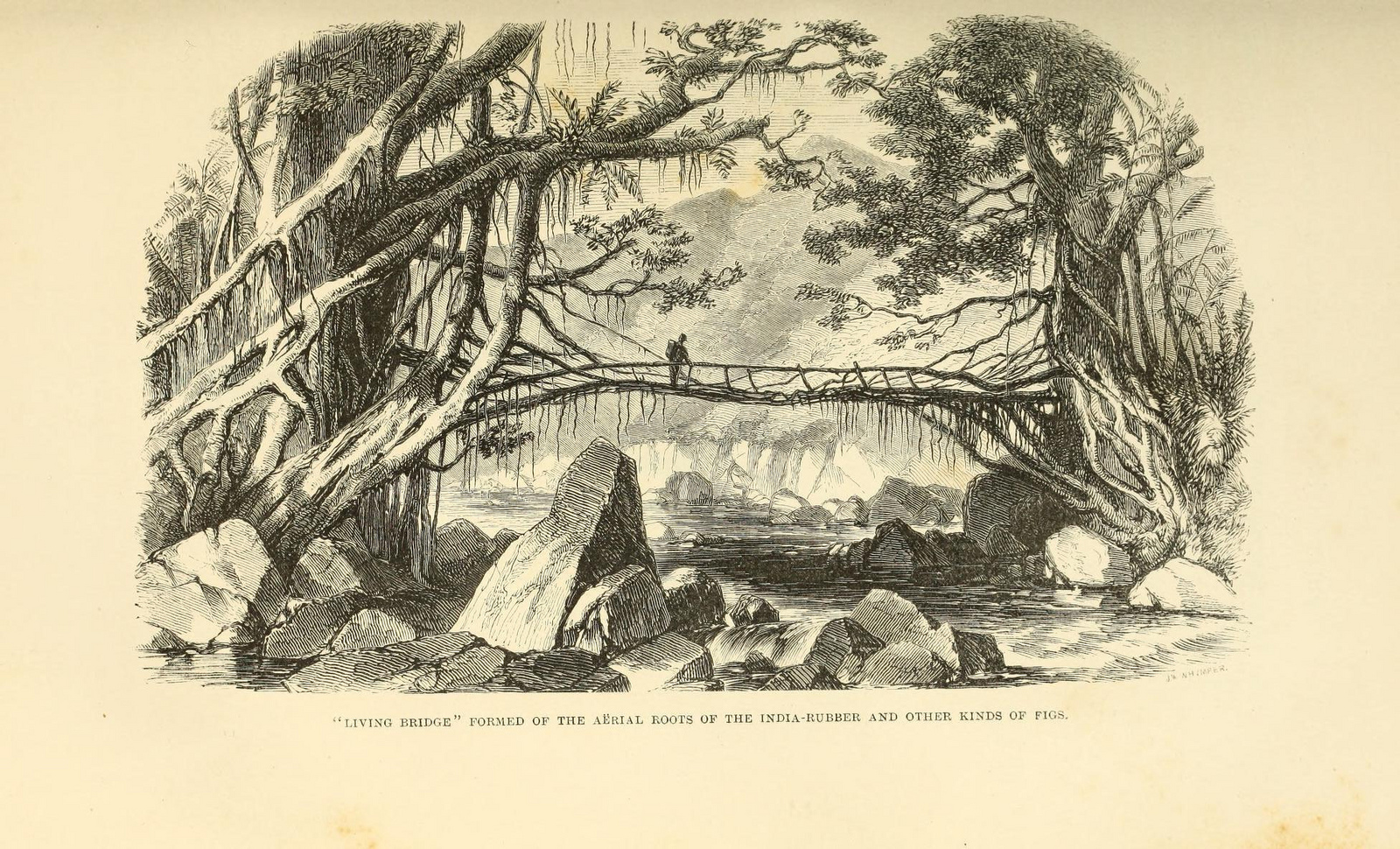
An 1854 illustration of Ficus elastica trained as a living bridge

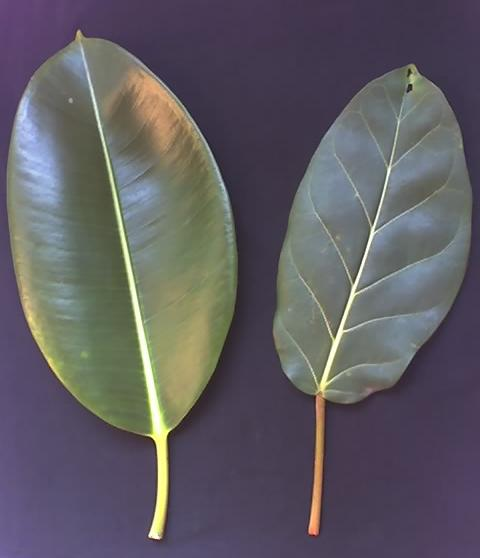
Ficus elastica leaf on the left compared to Ficus lutea on the right

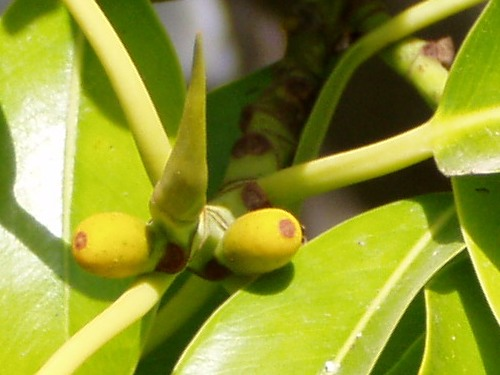
The figs of F. elastica

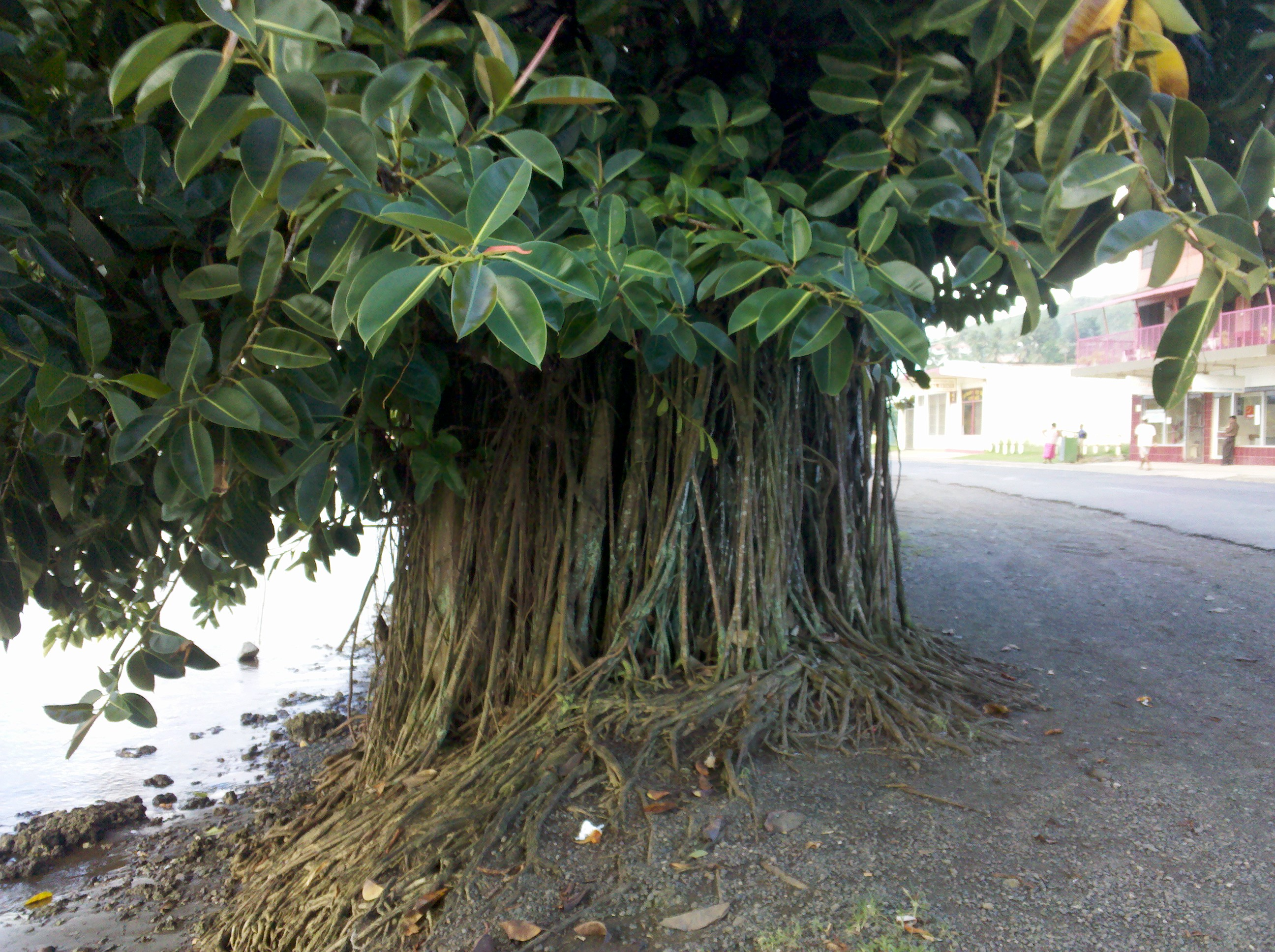
Ficus elastica near the roadside in Savusavu, Fiji, showing the effects of constant pruning on the growth form.

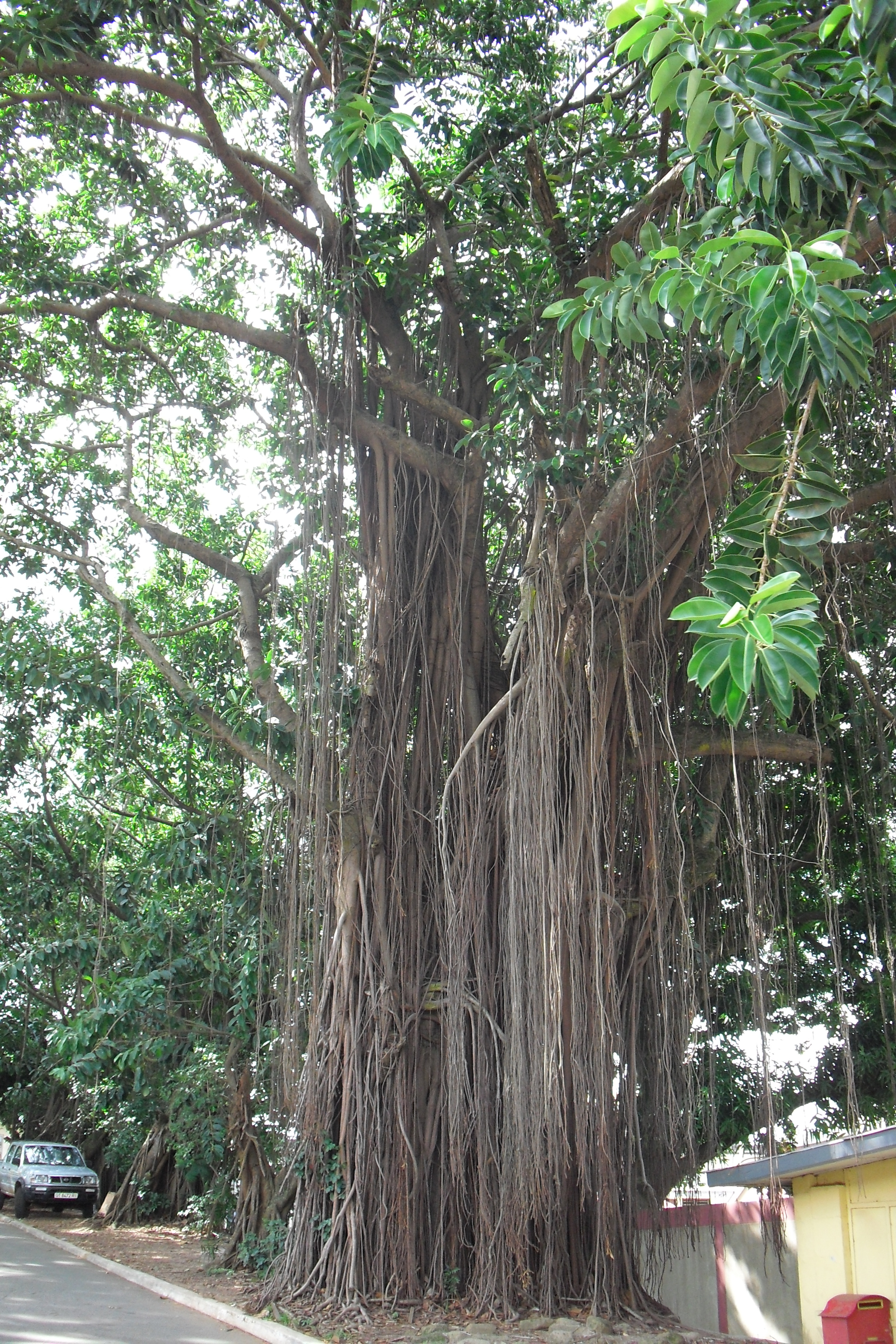
A huge Ficus elastica tree in Ghana showing the aerial roots.

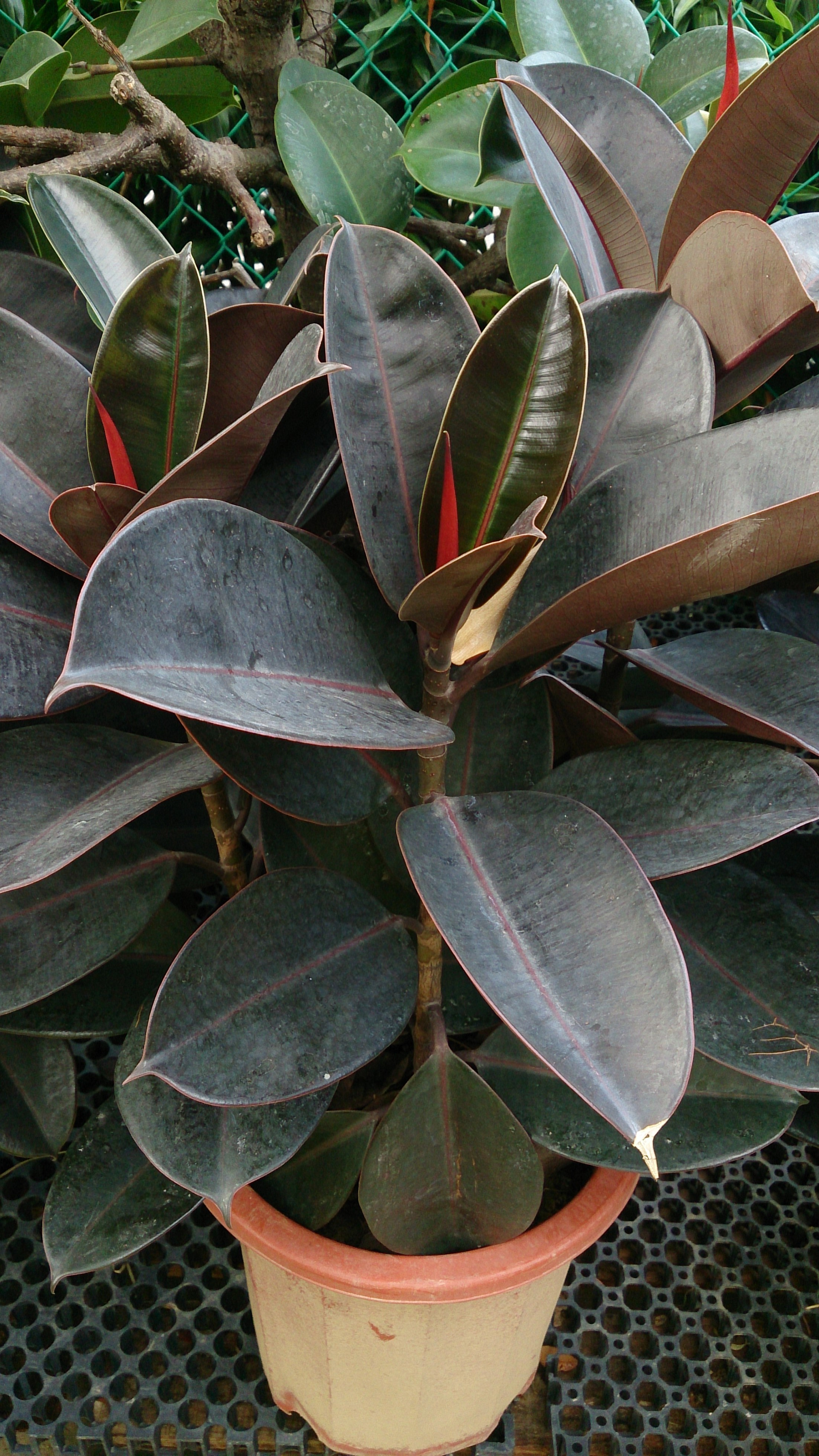
Many cultivars, such as this Ficus elastica 'Robusta', are common in the houseplant trade

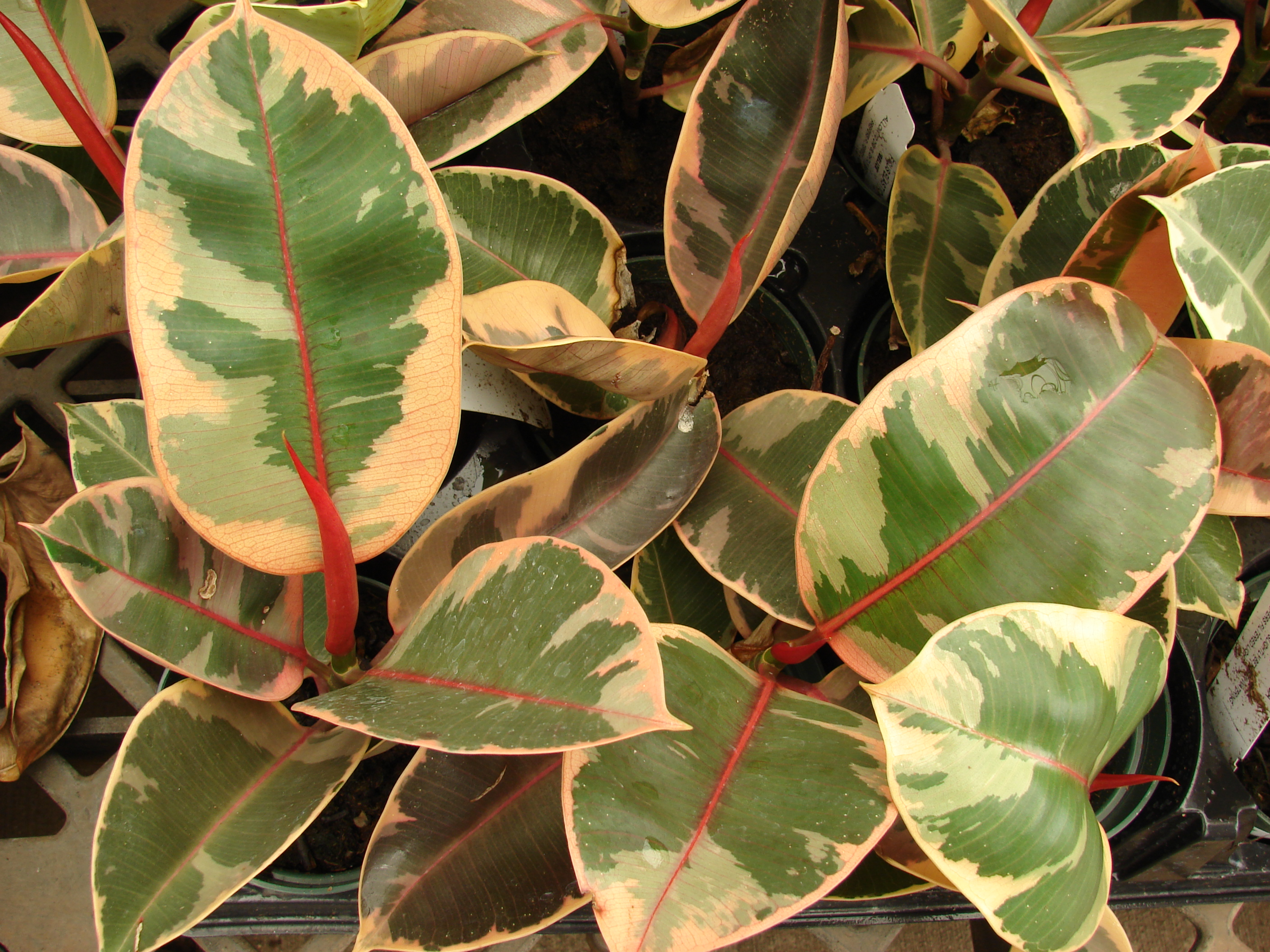
A variegated cultivar

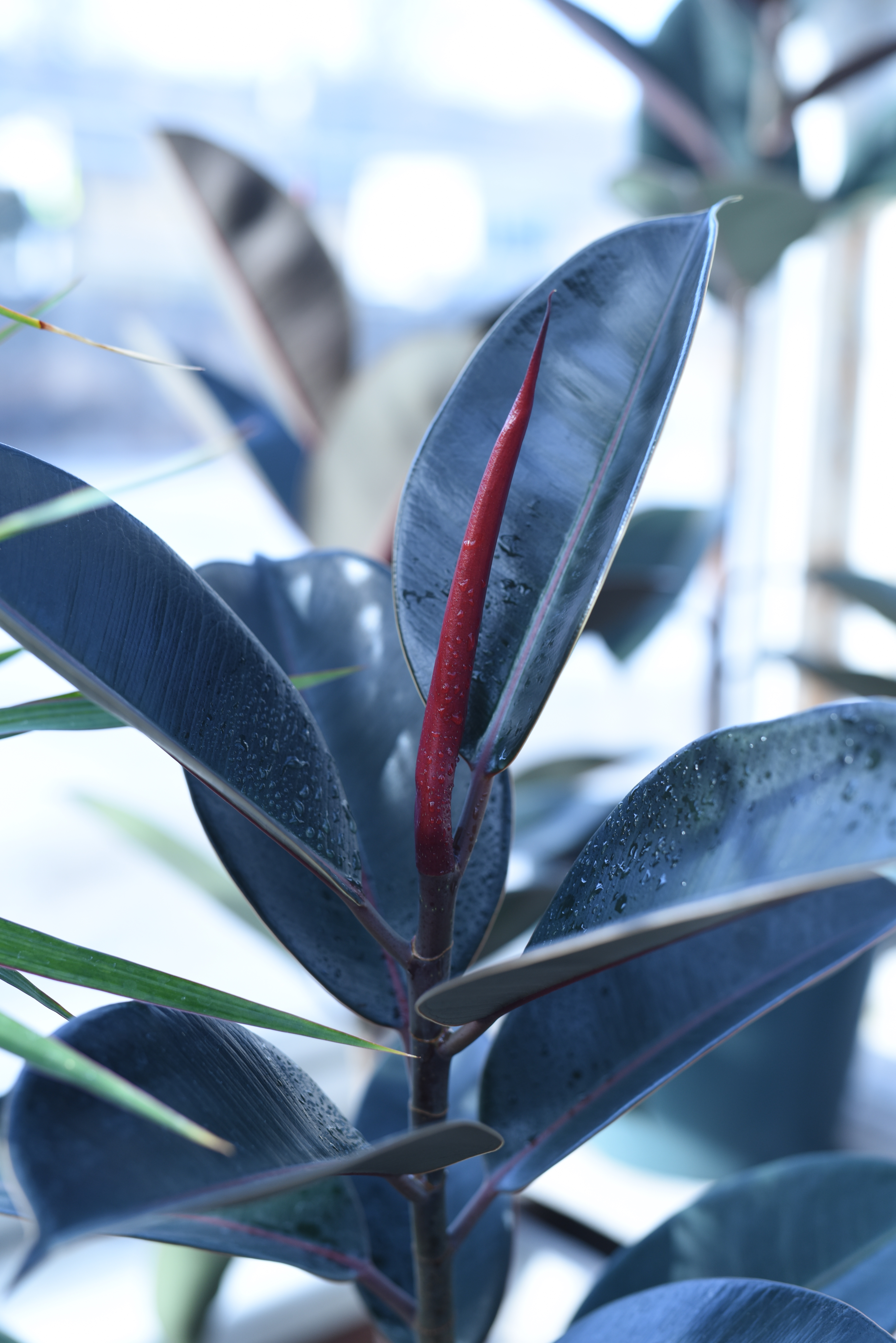
Ficus elastica, commonly called the rubber plant.

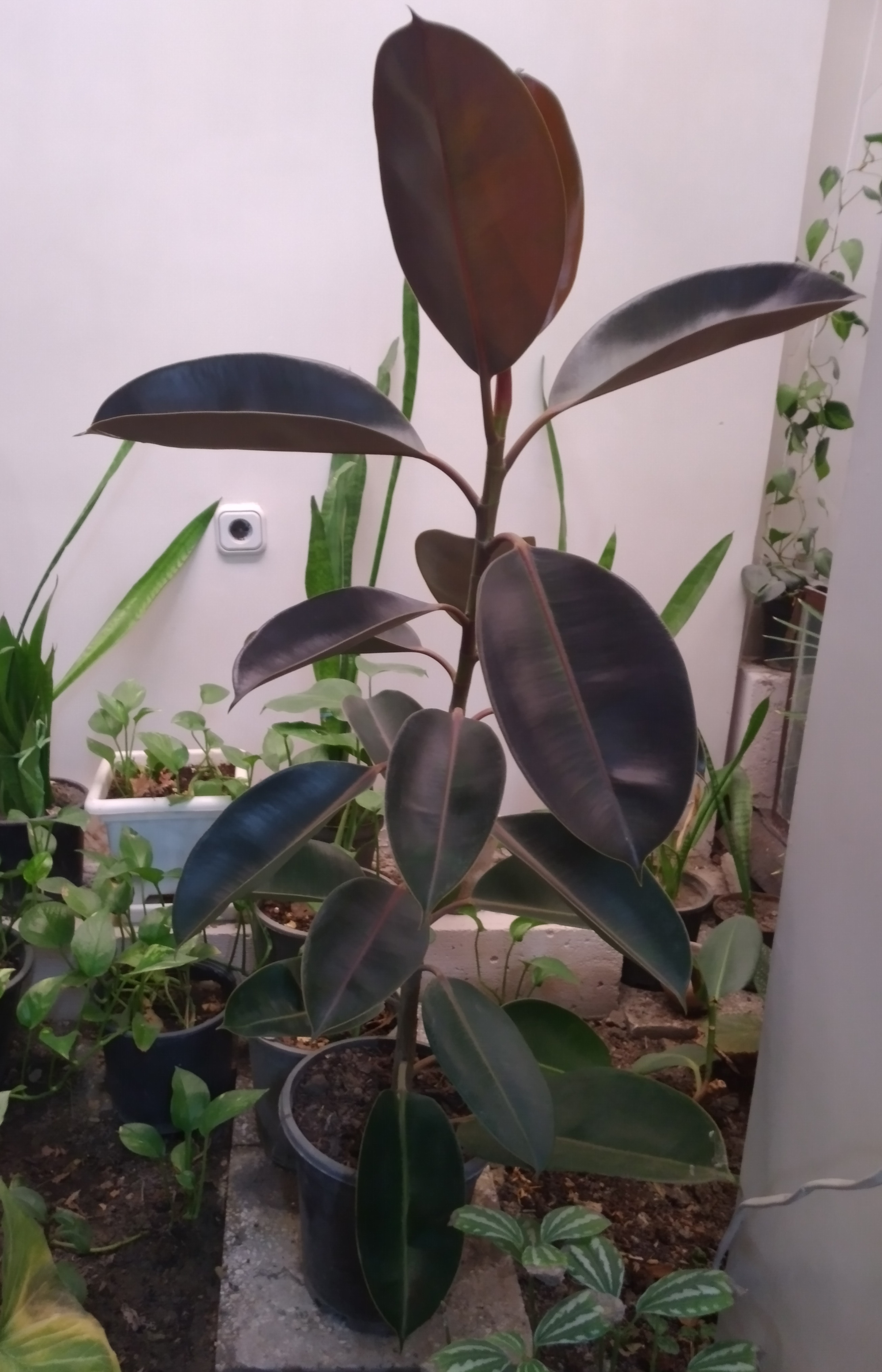
Ficus black

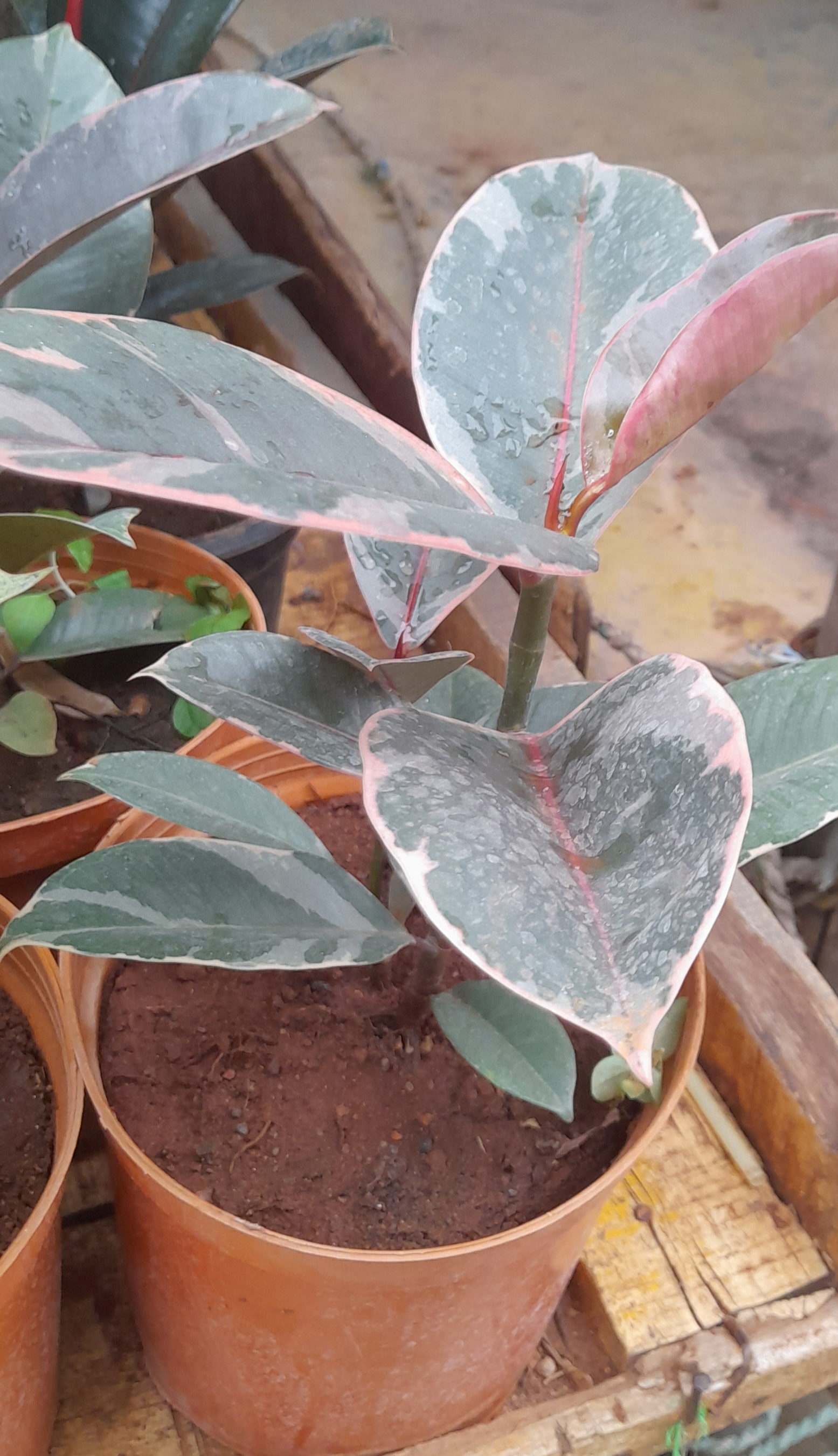
Ficus elastica 'Decora' ('Ruby' in Australia), a cultivar with pinkish hues
