= Laitkynsew =

- village
- Interactive map of Laitkynsew
- Country: India
- State: Meghalaya
- District: East Khasi Hills

Languages
  - Official: English
- Time zone: UTC+5:30 (IST)
- Telephone code: 793108
- Vehicle registration: ML
- Nearest city: Cherrapunji

Laitkynsew is a village in the East Khasi Hills district of Meghalaya State, in north-eastern India. It is perhaps best known for its living root bridges. The Umnnoi living root bridge, known locally as Jingkieng Deingjri, which means 'bridge of the rubber tree', is 53 feet long and over 100 years old. The Ka Likai waterfall, near the neighboring village of Nongriat, can best be seen from Laitkynsew, and the monsoon season in autumn is the most impressive time to view it.
