= Garlic (disambiguation) =

Garlic (Allium sativum) is a species in the onion genus commonly used as a food flavoring.

Garlic may also refer to:

== Places in the United States ==
- Garlic Island, Wisconsin
- Garlic Creek, near Buda, Texas

== Other uses ==
- Operation Garlic, a Royal Air Force Second World War attack
- Garlic Jr., a character from Dragon Ball

== See also ==
- Allium tuberosum, a Chinese plant known as garlic chives
- Peltaria alliacea, a perennial in the family Brassicaceae, known as garlic cress
- Pelobates fuscus, a species of toad nicknamed the garlic toad
- Garlick, a surname
