= P. emarginata =

P. emarginata may refer to:

- Paralimnophila emarginata, a crane fly species
- Peltaria emarginata, a species of flowering plant
- Prunus emarginata, the Oregon cherry or bitter cherry, a tree species native to western North America
- Pinguicula emarginata, a species of butterwort.
