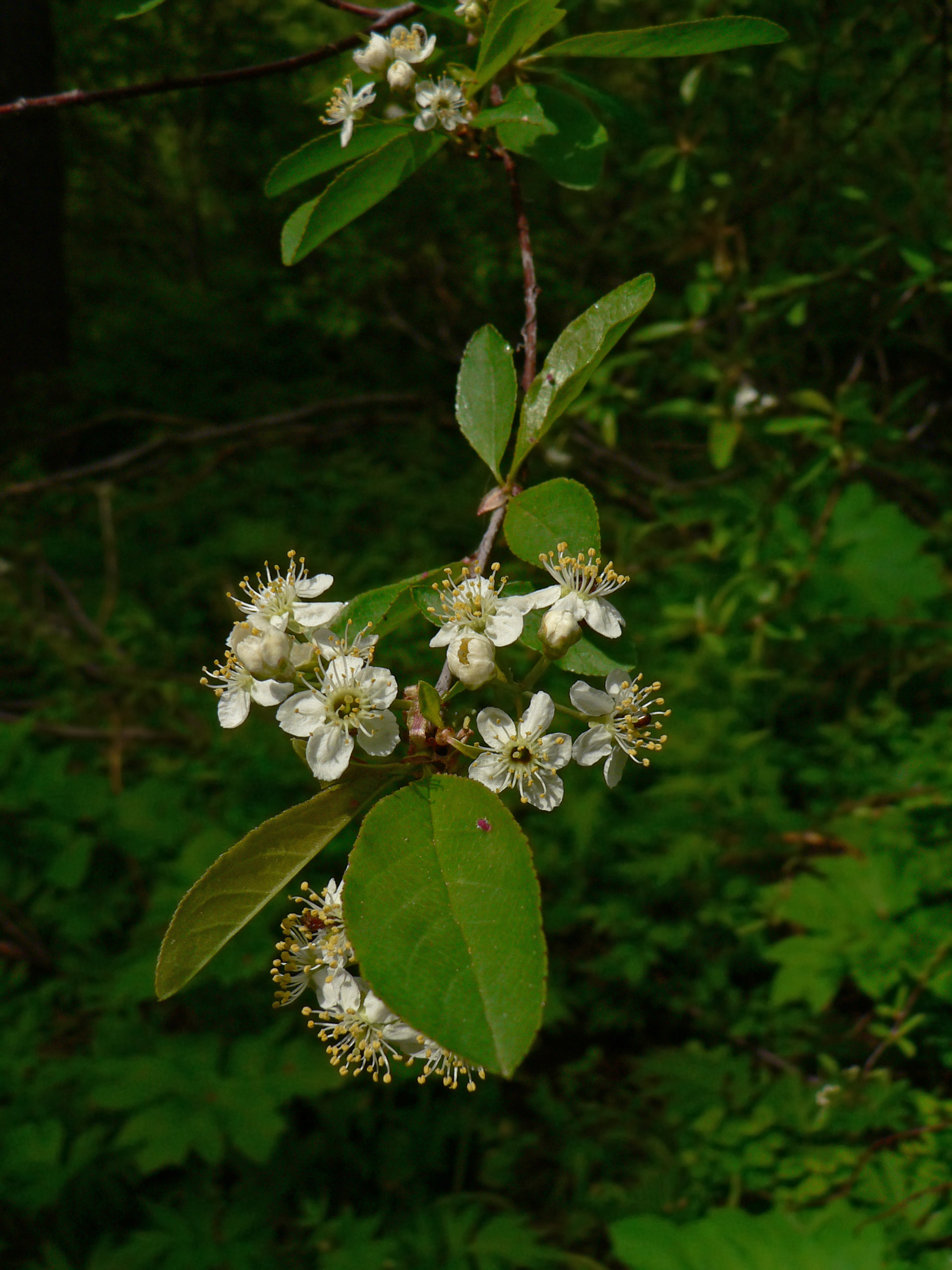
- Leaves and flowers

Conservation status
- Least Concern (IUCN 3.1)

Scientific classification
- Kingdom: Plantae
- Clade: Embryophytes
- Clade: Tracheophytes
- Clade: Angiosperms
- Clade: Eudicots
- Clade: Rosids
- Order: Rosales
- Family: Rosaceae
- Genus: Prunus
- Subgenus: Prunus subg. Cerasus
- Species: P. emarginata

Binomial name
- Prunus emarginata (Dougl. ex Hook.) Eaton
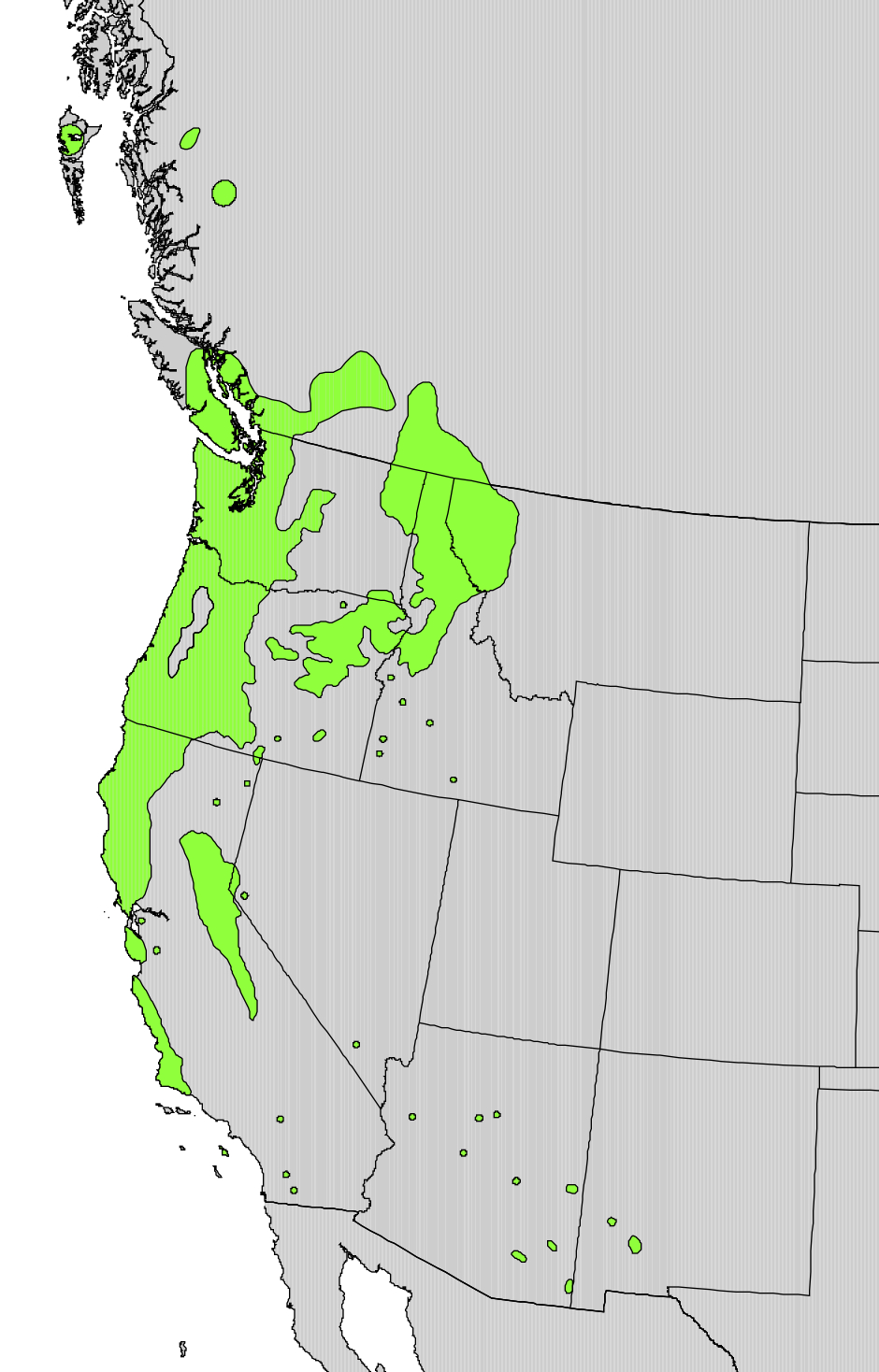
- Natural range

Synonyms
- List: Cerasus arida Greene; Cerasus emarginata Douglas; Padus emarginata (Douglas ex Hook.) S.Ya.Sokolov; Prunus emarginata var. crenulata (Greene) Kearney & Peebles; Prunus erecta Walp.; Prunus crenulata Tidestr.; Prunus pattoniana hort.; Prunus prunifolia (Greene) Shafer

= Prunus emarginata =

Species of tree

Prunus emarginata, the bitter cherry or Oregon cherry, is a species of Prunus native to western North America.

== Taxonomy ==
There are two varieties:

- Prunus emarginata var. emarginata. Usually shrubby; young shoots and leaves hairless or only thinly hairy. Most of the species' range.
- Prunus emarginata var. mollis (Dougl.) Brew. A larger tree; young shoots and leaves downy. Reddish-brown bark with light horizontal bands resembling water birch. Oregon north to British Columbia, mainly coastal.

== Description ==
Prunus emarginata is a deciduous shrub or small tree growing to 1–15 metres (3 1/2–49 feet) tall; west of the Cascade Range, it commonly reaches 24–30 m (80–100 ft) tall. It has a slender oval trunk and smooth gray to reddish-brown bark with horizontal lenticels. The leaves are 2–8 centimetres (3/4–3 1/8 inches) long, thin, egg-shaped, and yellowish-green with unevenly sized teeth on either side.

The flowers are small, 10–15 millimetres (3/8–5/8 in) diameter, with five white petals and numerous hairlike stamens; they are almond-scented, produced in clusters in spring, and pollinated by insects.

The fruit is a juicy red or purple cherry 7–14 mm (1/4–1/2 in) diameter, which, as the plant's English name suggests, are bitter. As well as reproducing by seed, it also sends out underground stems which then sprout above the surface to create a thicket.

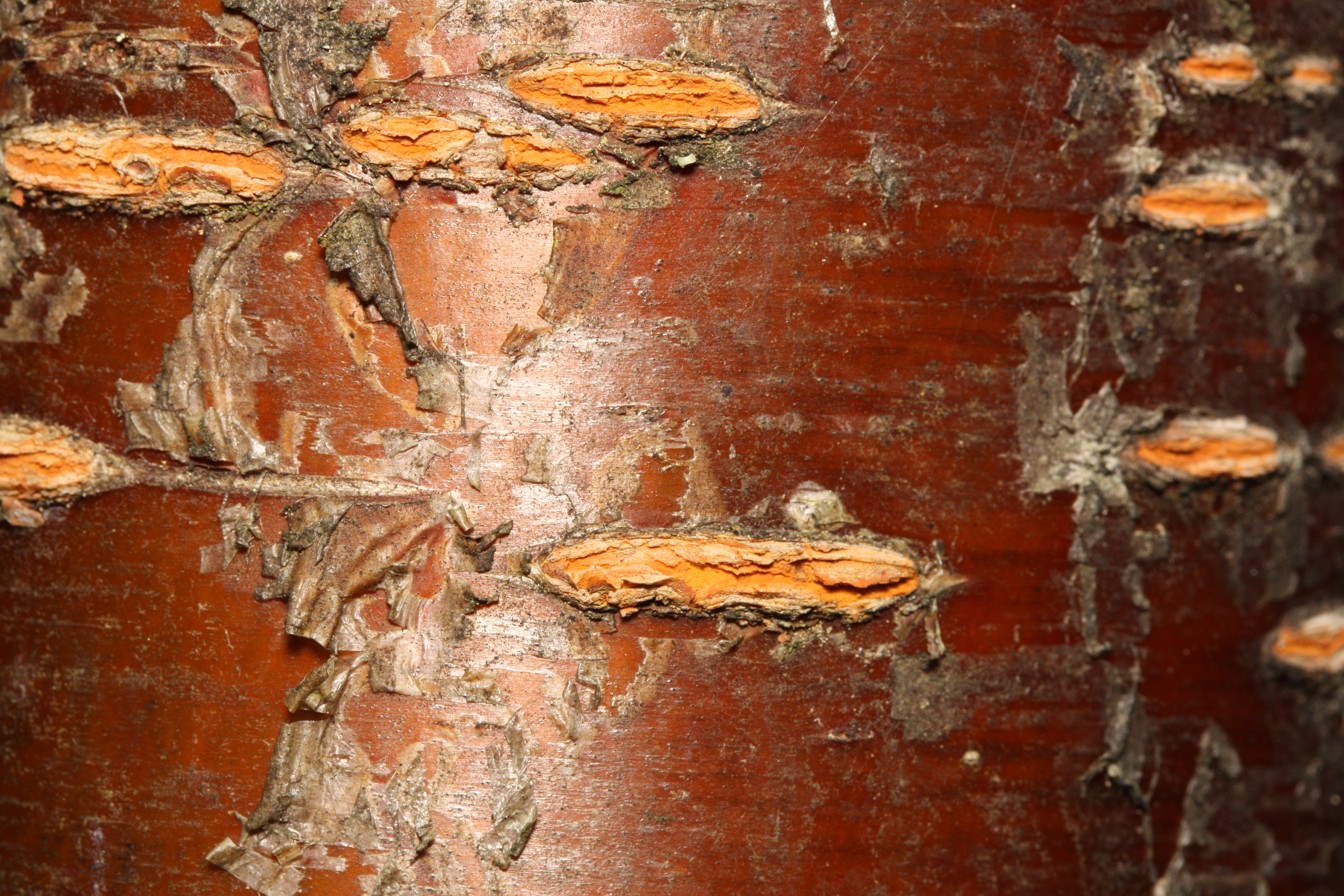
Bark close-up

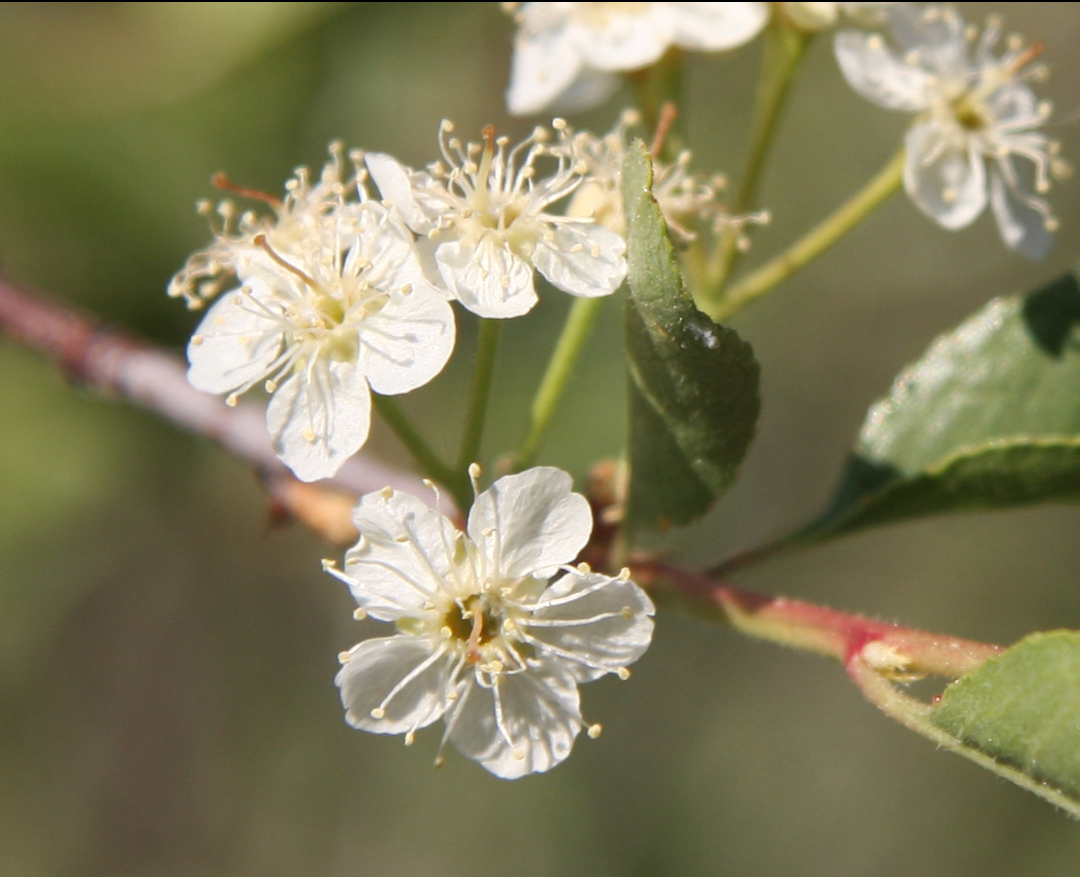
Flowers

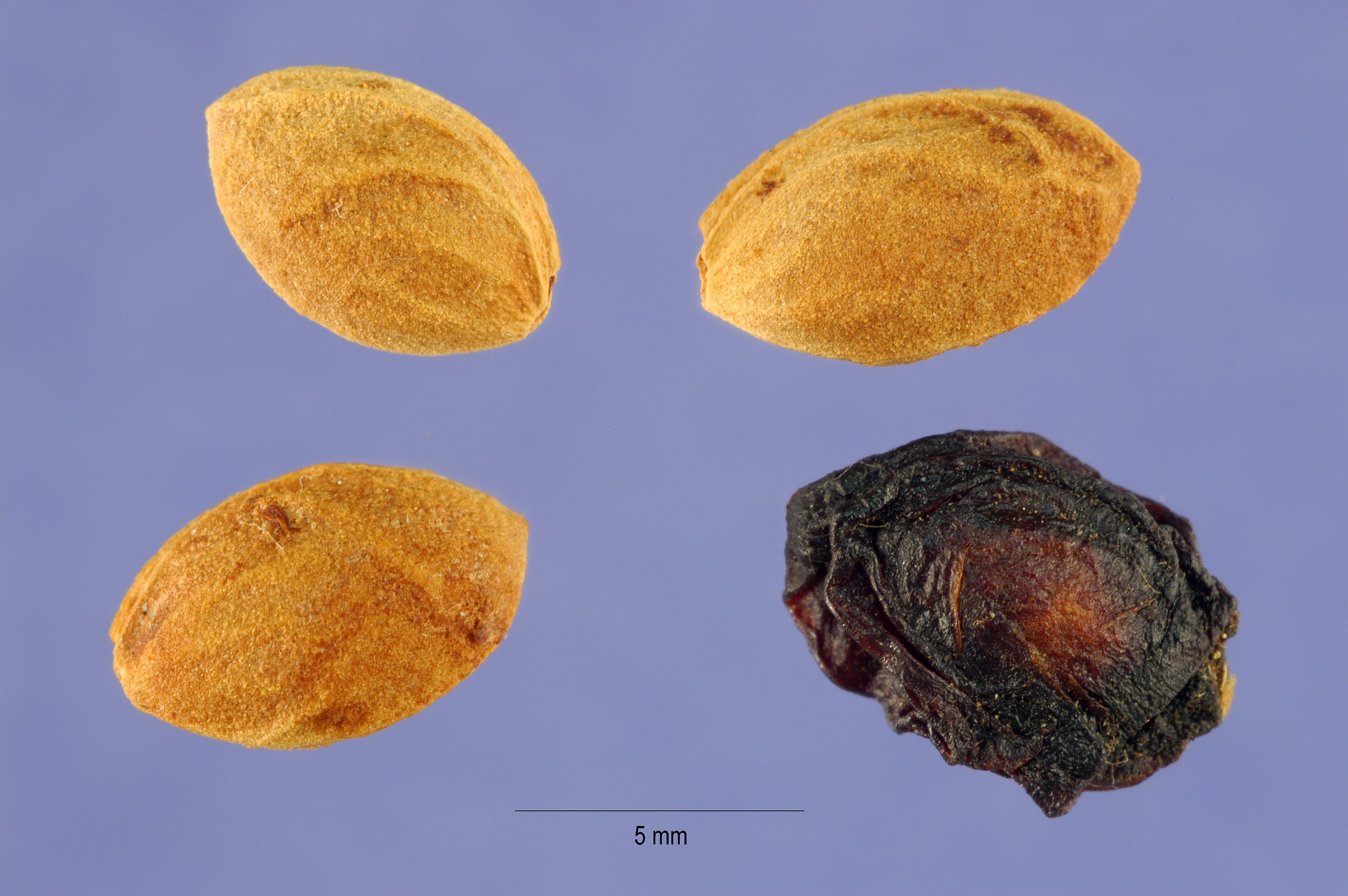
Pits

=== Similar species ===
Prunus pensylvanica, the pin cherry, is closely related.

== Distribution and habitat ==
It is native to western North America from British Columbia south to Baja California, and east as far as western Wyoming and New Mexico. It is often found in recently disturbed areas or open woods on nutrient-rich soil.

== Ecology ==
Mammals, deer and livestock forage on the leaves. The cherries are eaten by some birds (especially cedar waxwing), who in turn distribute the seeds. The seeds have hard shells which can preserve them for decades before being released by fire.

The tree is a larval host to the blinded sphinx, elegant sphinx, Lorquin's admiral, pale tiger swallowtail, small-eyed sphinx, spring azure, twin-spotted sphinx, and western tiger swallowtail.

== Cultivation ==
It has hybridized with the introduced European Prunus avium in the Puget Sound area; the hybrid has been named Prunus × pugetensis. It is intermediate between the parent species, but is nearly sterile, producing almost no cherries.

== Uses ==
The extremely bitter cherries are inedible to humans. Native Americans used the bark in basket making.

=== Medicinal ===
Native tribes, most notably Kwakwaka'wakw, used parts of the plant for medicinal purposes, such as poultices and bark infusions. The isoflavone prunetin was isolated for the first time by Finnemore in 1910 from the bark of P. emarginata.
