= Island Park =

Island Park may refer to:

== Places ==
Canada

- Island Park, Ottawa, neighbourhood in Ottawa named for Island Park Drive

United States

- Island Park, Idaho, a city
- Island Park Caldera, a volcanic caldera extending in Idaho and Wyoming
- Island Park, Indiana, an unincorporated community
- Island Park, New York, a village
  - Island Park station, a train station in the village
- Island Park, Rhode Island, a former census-designated place in Rhode Island
- Island Park, Wisconsin, an unincorporated community
- Island Park (Lake Winnebago), or Garlic Island, a small island in Wisconsin
- Island Park (Pennsylvania), a stadium on City Island, in the Susquehanna River between Harrisburg and Wormleysburg, Pennsylvania
- Island Park (Racine, Wisconsin), a neighborhood park
- Tate Field, known as Island Park and Mayo Island Park, a stadium in Richmond, Virginia
