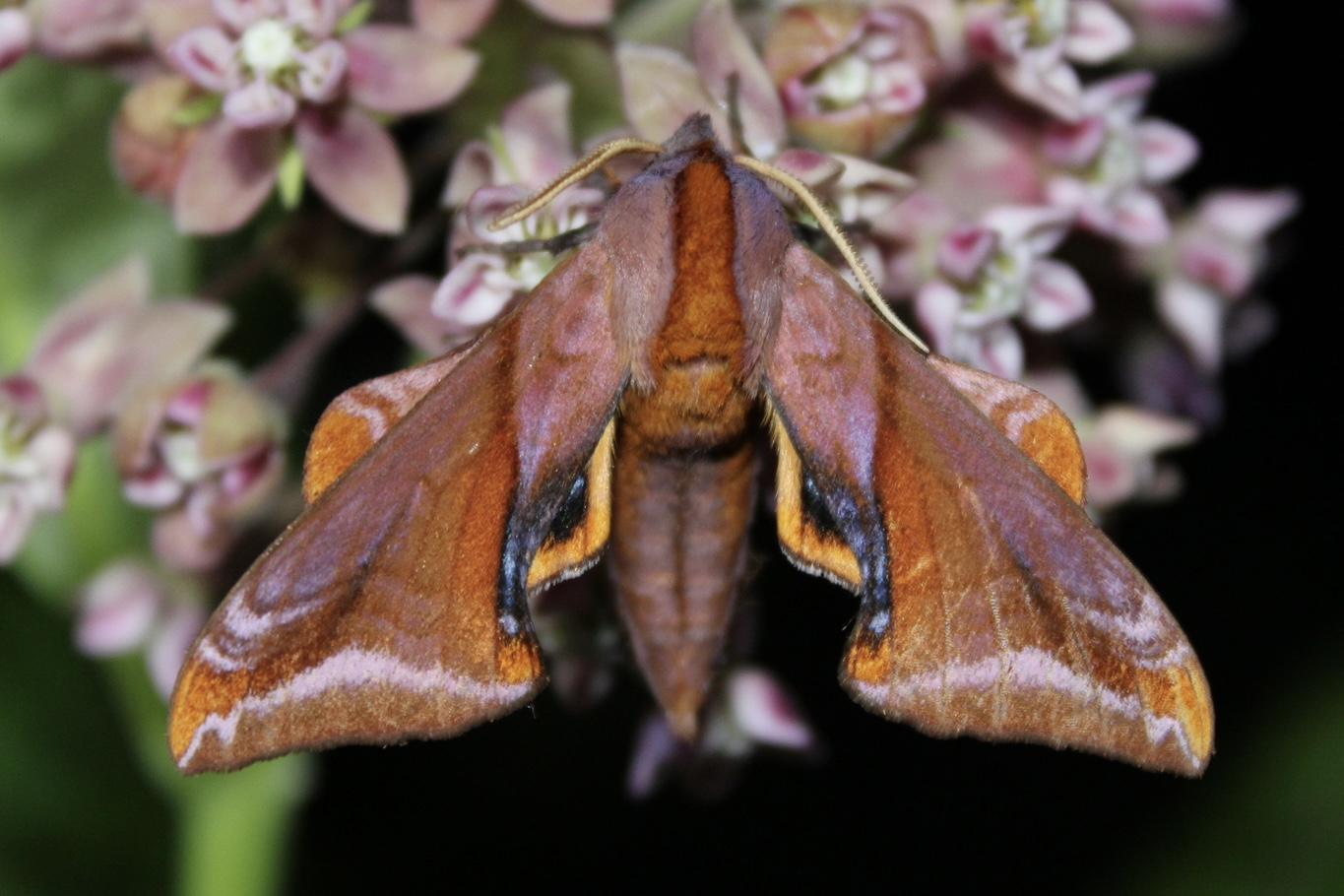
- Paonias astylus on milkweed
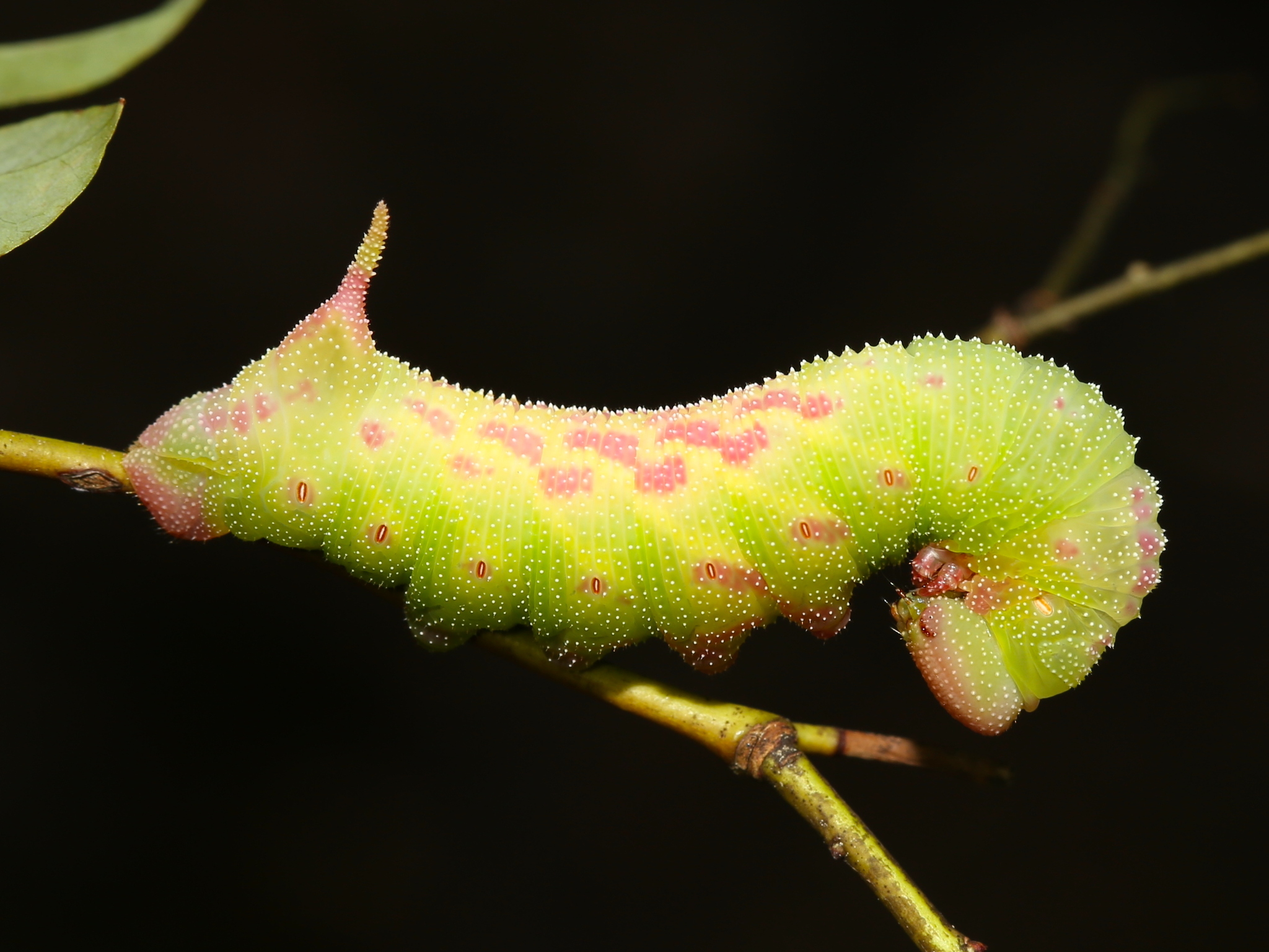
- Huckleberry sphinx caterpillar

Scientific classification
- Kingdom: Animalia
- Phylum: Arthropoda
- Class: Insecta
- Order: Lepidoptera
- Family: Sphingidae
- Genus: Paonias
- Species: P. astylus

Binomial name
- Paonias astylus (Drury, 1773)

Synonyms
- Sphinx astylus Drury, 1773; Sphinx io Guérin-Méneville, [1829-1831]; Smerinthus integerrima Harris, 1833; Smerinthus integerrima Harris, 1839

= Paonias astylus =

Huckleberry sphinx

Species of moth

Paonias astylus, the huckleberry sphinx, is a moth in the family Sphingidae. The species was first described by Dru Drury in 1773.

== Distribution ==
It is found in eastern North America, from Maine south to Florida, west to Missouri and Mississippi.

== Description ==
The wingspan is 55–65 mm. Adults are on wing from March to June and again in September in two generations in Florida. There is one generation with adults on wing in July in the northern part of its range.

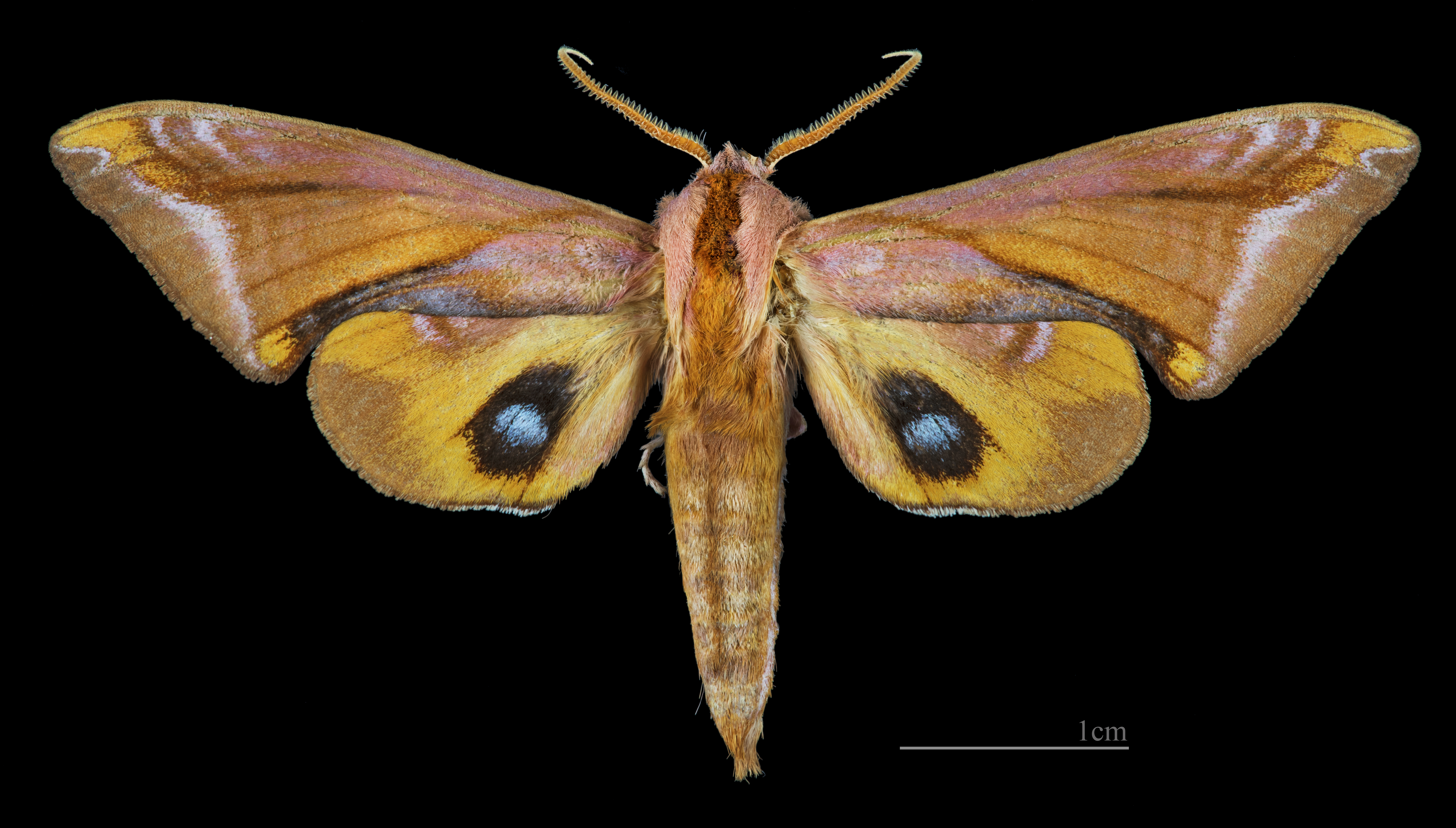
Paonias astylus ♂

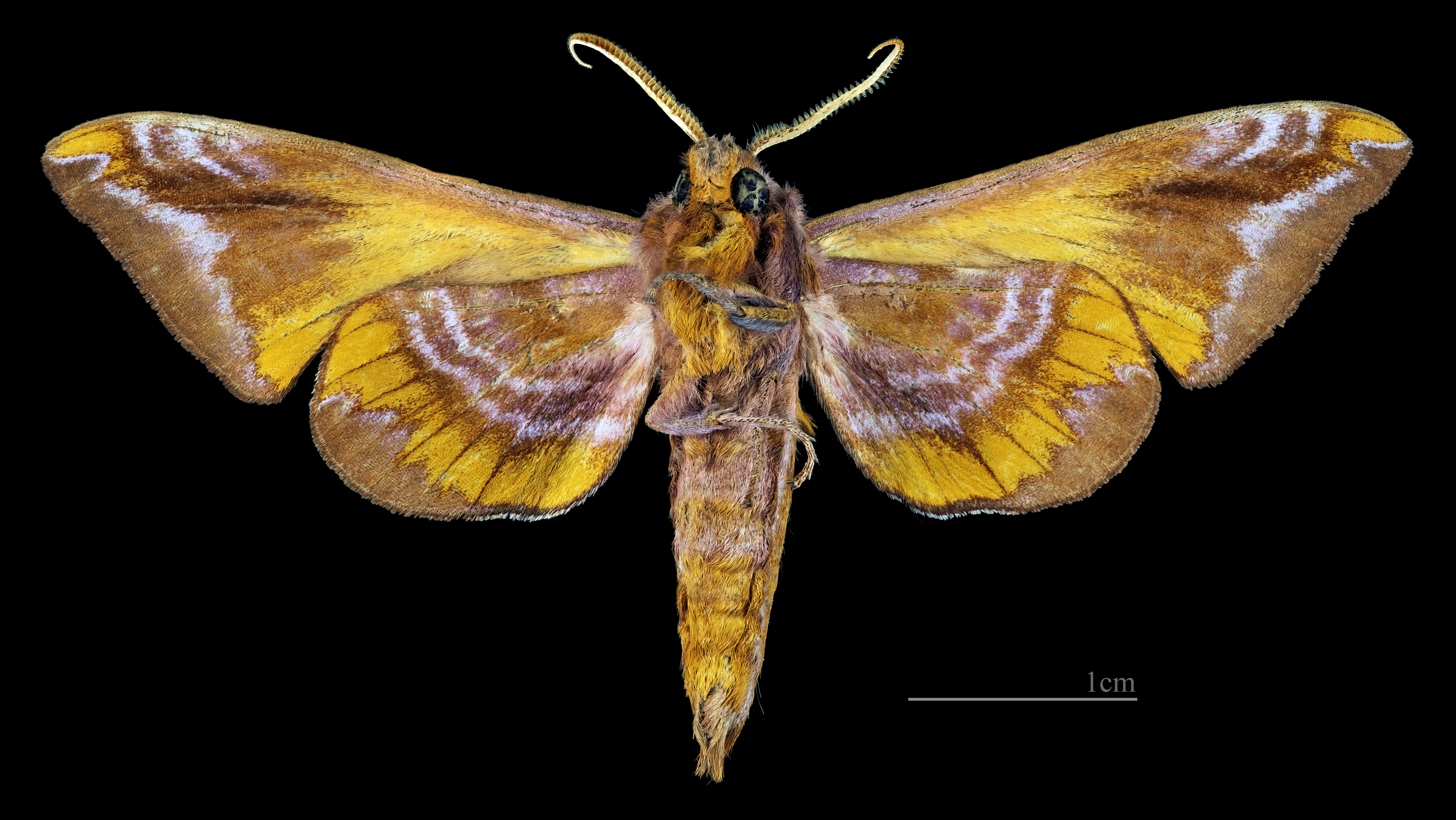
Paonias astylus ♂ △

== Biology ==
The larvae feed on blueberry, Vaccinium (including V. vacillans and V. corymbosum), Prunus, Andromeda and Salix. Adults do not feed.
