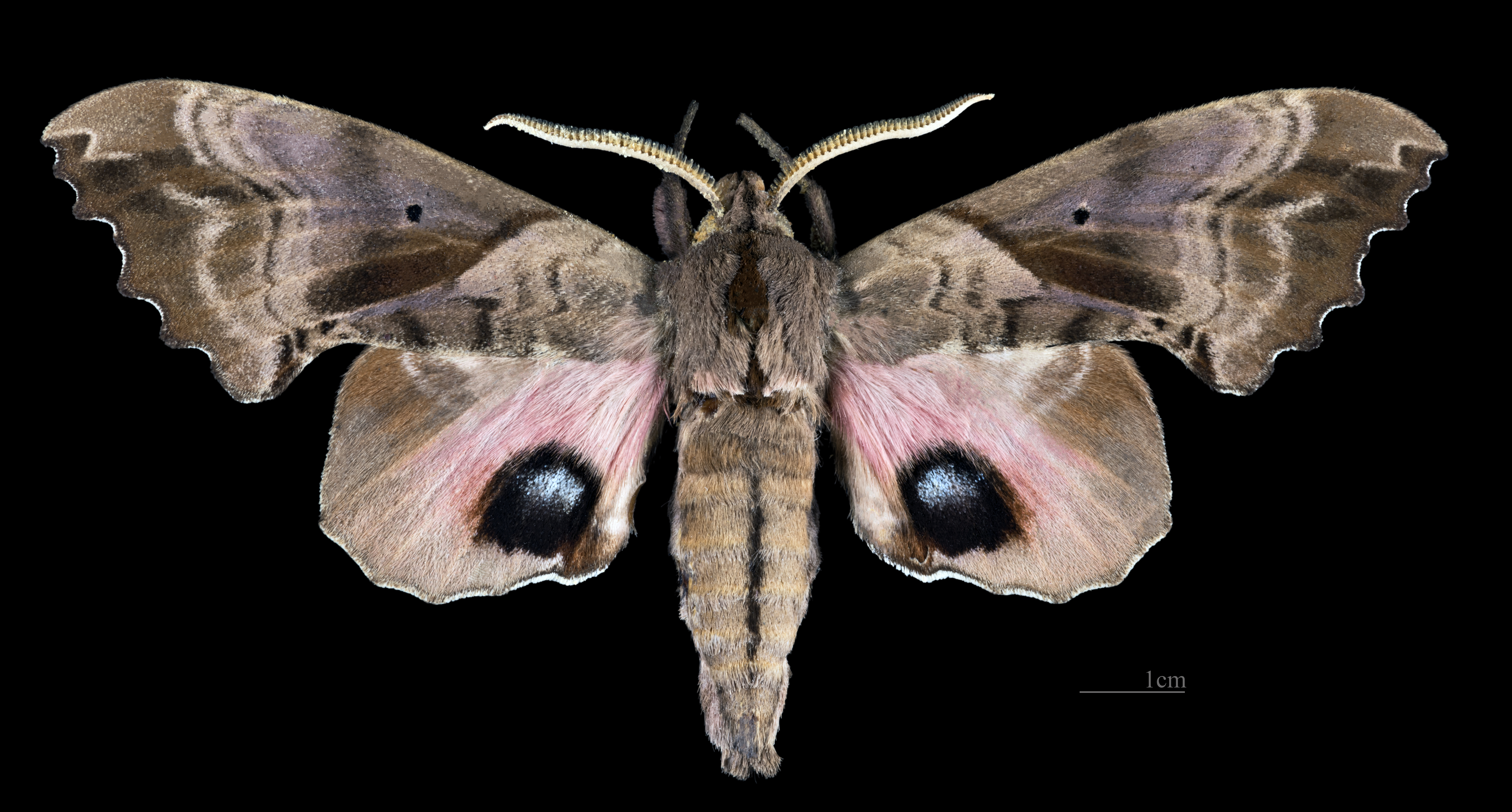
- Paonias excaecatus

Scientific classification
- Domain: Eukaryota
- Kingdom: Animalia
- Phylum: Arthropoda
- Class: Insecta
- Order: Lepidoptera
- Family: Sphingidae
- Tribe: Smerinthini
- Genus: Paonias; Hübner, 1819

Synonyms
- Calasymbolus Grote, 1873

= Paonias =

Genus of moths

Paonias is a genus of moths in the family Sphingidae first described by Jacob Hübner in 1819.

== Species ==
- Paonias astylus (Drury 1773)
- Paonias excaecatus (J. E. Smith 1797)
- Paonias macrops Gehlen, 1933
- Paonias myops (J. E. Smith 1797)
- Paonias wolfei Cadiou & Haxaire 1997
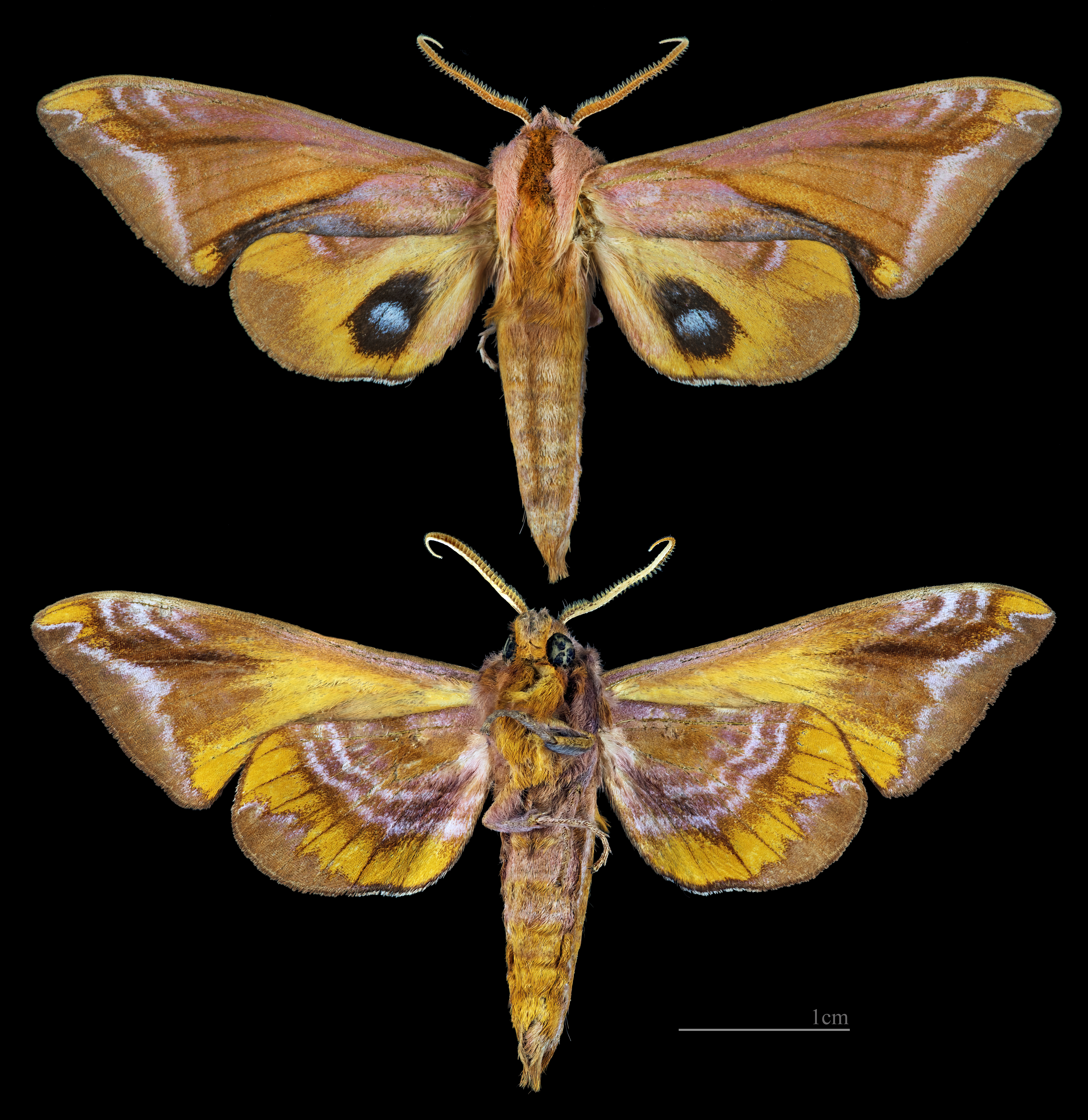
Paonias astylus

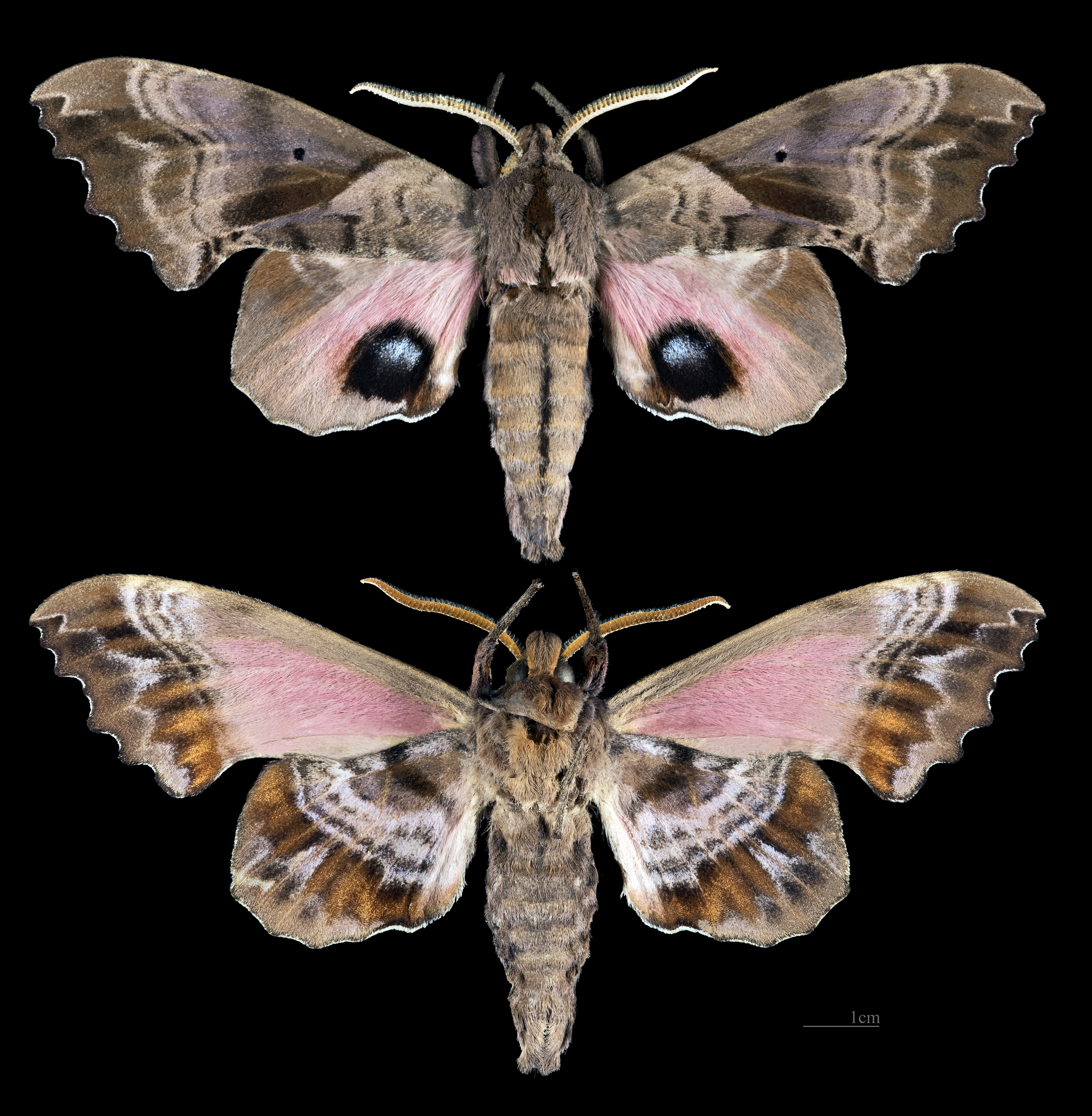
Paonias excaecatus

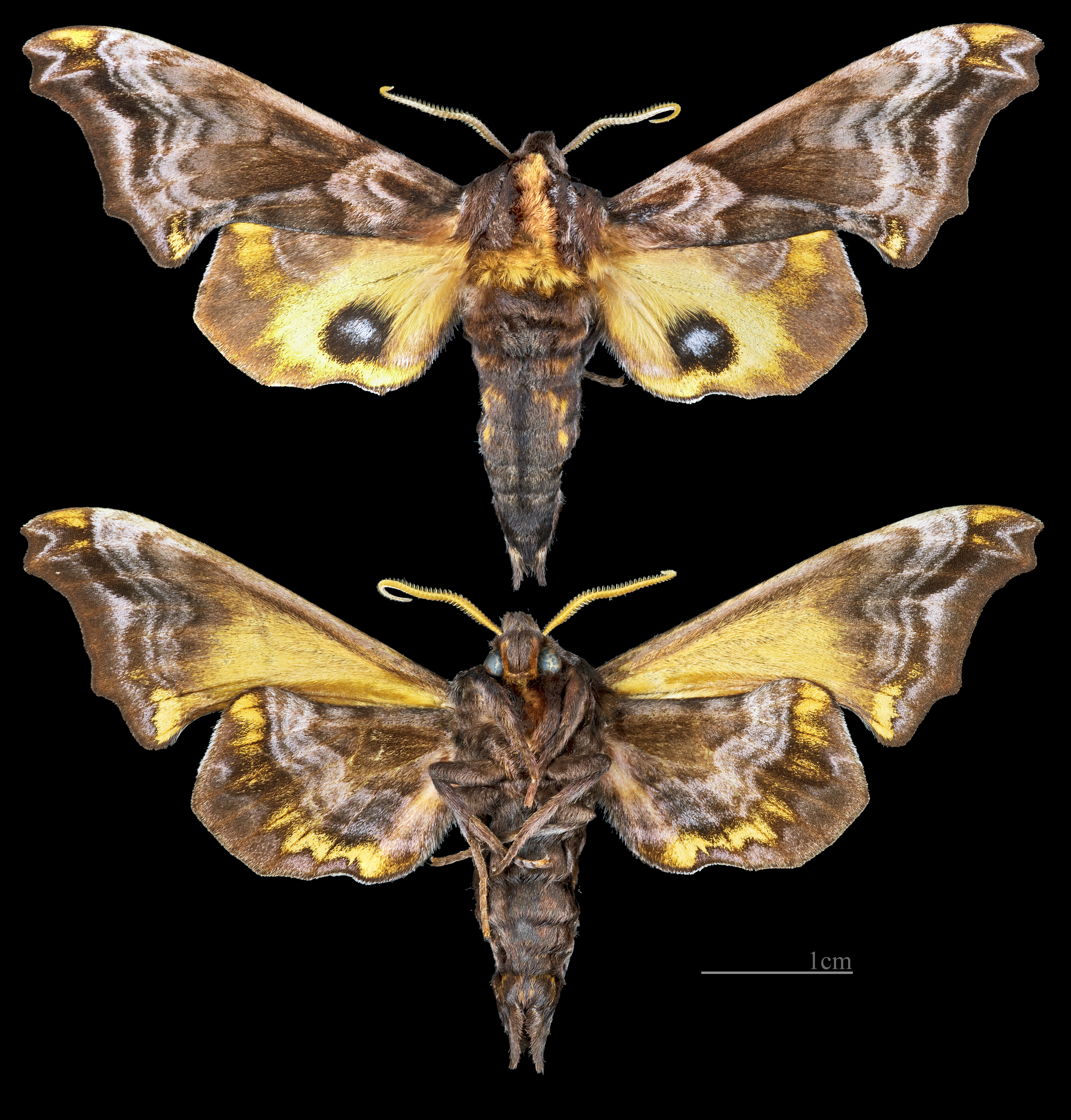
Paonias myops
