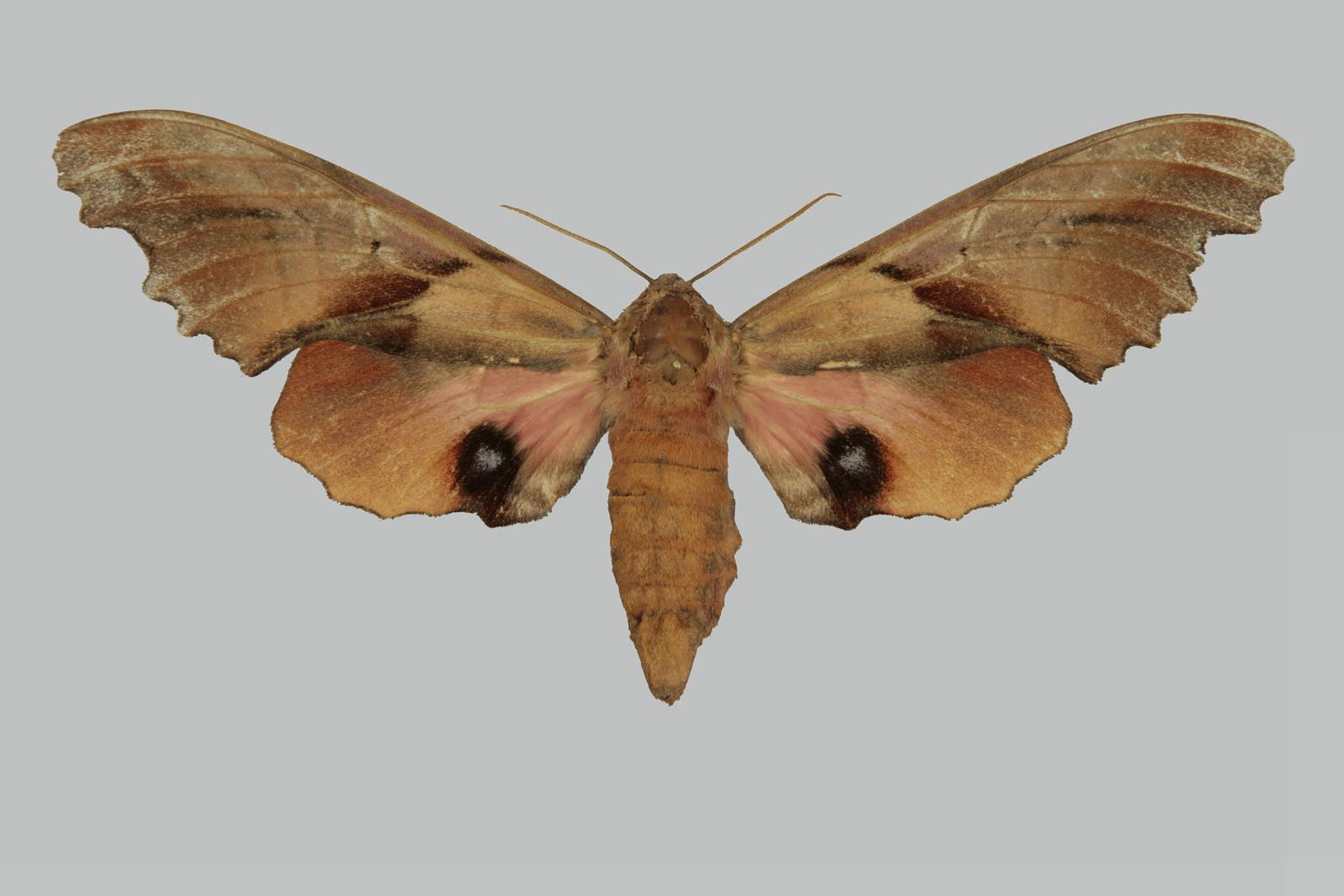

Scientific classification
- Kingdom: Animalia
- Phylum: Arthropoda
- Clade: Pancrustacea
- Class: Insecta
- Order: Lepidoptera
- Family: Sphingidae
- Genus: Paonias
- Species: P. wolfei

Binomial name
- Paonias wolfei Cadiou & Haxaire, 1997

= Paonias wolfei =

Species of moth

Paonias wolfei is a moth of the family Sphingidae. It was described by Jean-Marie Cadiou and Jean Haxaire in 1997. It is known from Mexico.
