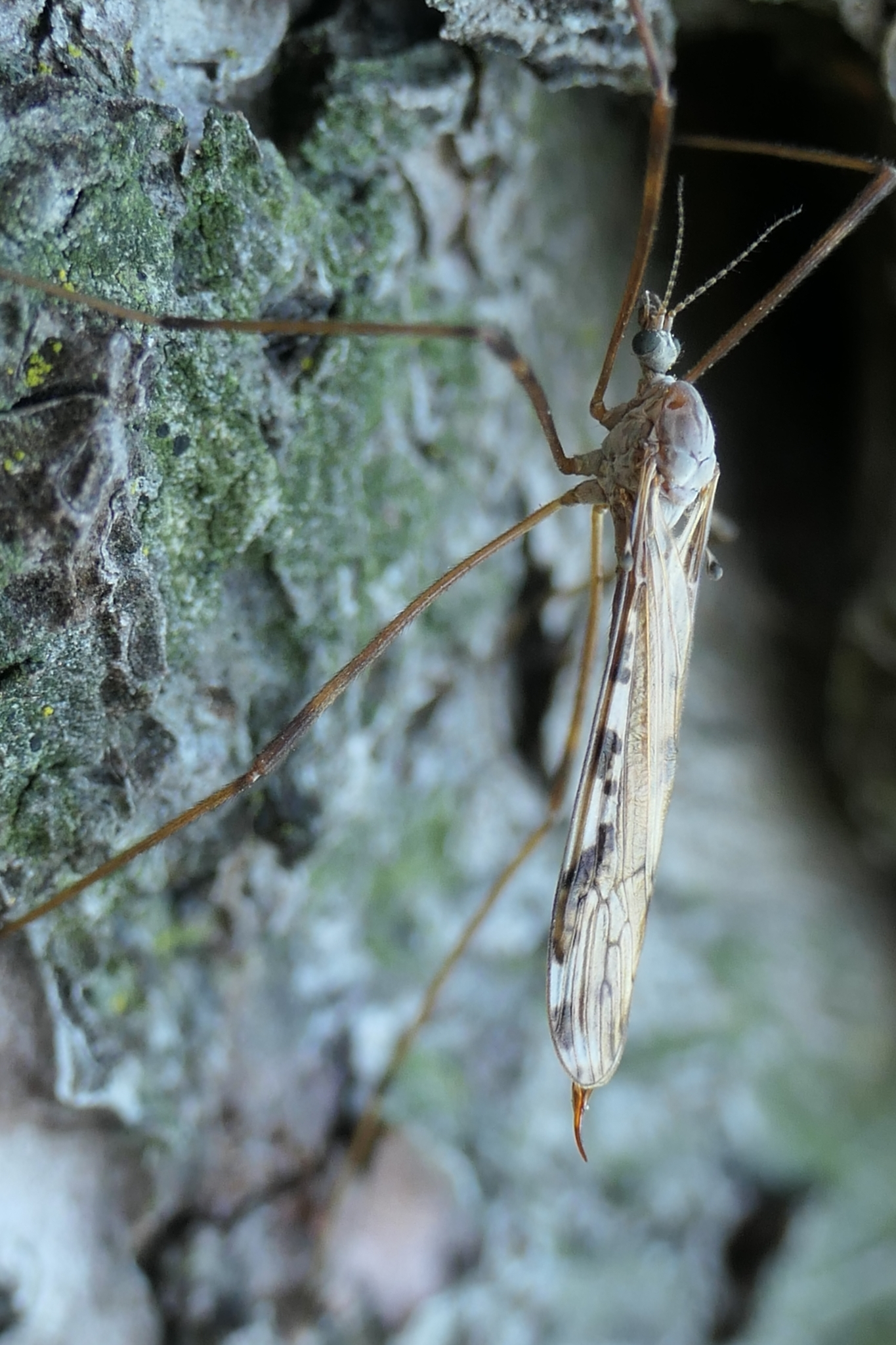
- Paralimnophila skusei

Scientific classification
- Kingdom: Animalia
- Phylum: Arthropoda
- Class: Insecta
- Order: Diptera
- Family: Limoniidae
- Subfamily: Limnophilinae
- Genus: Paralimnophila; Alexander, 1921

Type species
- Limnophila leucophaeata Skuse, 1890

Subgenera
- Papuaphila Alexander, 1947; Paralimnophila Alexander, 1921

= Paralimnophila =

Genus of flies

Paralimnophila is a genus of fly in the family Limoniidae. Its members are found in Asia & Australasia.

== Species ==
- Subgenus Papuaphila Alexander, 1947

- P. angusticincta Alexander, 1960
- P. apicalis (de Meijere, 1913)
- P. contingens (Walker, 1865)
- P. decorata Alexander, 1960
- P. delecta Alexander, 1962
- P. euchroma (Walker, 1861)
- P. euryphaea (Alexander, 1947)
- P. fuscoabdominalis (Alexander, 1947)
- P. holoxantha Alexander, 1962
- P. perdiffusa Alexander, 1962
- P. selectissima (Walker, 1864)
- P. sponsa Alexander, 1960
- P. terminalis (Walker, 1861)
- P. toxopeana Alexander, 1960

- Subgenus Paralimnophila Alexander, 1921

- P. albofasciata (Alexander, 1934)
- P. alice Theischinger, 1996
- P. artursiana Theischinger, 1996
- P. aurantiipennis (Alexander, 1923)
- P. aurantionigra Alexander, 1978
- P. barockee Theischinger, 1996
- P. barringtonia (Alexander, 1928)
- P. bicincta (Alexander, 1928)
- P. bingelima Theischinger, 1996
- P. boobootella Theischinger, 1996
- P. caledonica (Alexander, 1948)
- P. christine Theischinger, 1996
- P. conspersa (Enderlein, 1912)
- P. cooloola Theischinger, 1996
- P. danbulla Theischinger, 1996
- P. decincta (Alexander, 1928)
- P. diffusior Alexander, 1968
- P. dobrotworskyi Theischinger, 1996
- P. emarginata Alexander, 1981
- P. eucrypta (Alexander, 1931)
- P. eungella Theischinger, 1996
- P. flammeola Alexander, 1924
- P. flavipes (Alexander, 1922)
- P. fraudulenta Alexander, 1924
- P. fuscodorsata (Alexander, 1928)
- P. gingera Theischinger, 1996
- P. gracilirama (Alexander, 1937)
- P. grampiana Theischinger, 1996
- P. guttulicosta (Alexander, 1934)
- P. harrisoni (Alexander, 1928)
- P. hybrida Theischinger, 1996
- P. incompta (Alexander, 1928)
- P. indecora (Alexander, 1922)
- P. infestiva (Alexander, 1929)
- P. irrorata (Philippi, 1866)
- P. isolata (Alexander, 1947)
- P. kosciuskana (Alexander, 1929)
- P. leucophaeata (Skuse, 1890)
- P. macquarie Theischinger, 1996
- P. maxwelliana Theischinger, 1996
- P. minuscula (Alexander, 1922)
- P. mossmanensis Theischinger, 1996
- P. murdunna Theischinger, 1996
- P. mystica (Alexander, 1928)
- P. neboissi Theischinger, 1996
- P. neocaledonica (Alexander, 1945)
- P. nigritarsis Alexander, 1969
- P. pachyspila (Alexander, 1928)
- P. pallidicornis (Alexander, 1930)
- P. pallitarsis (Alexander, 1929)
- P. pectinella (Alexander, 1937)
- P. perirrorata (Alexander, 1928)
- P. perreducta (Alexander, 1939)
- P. pewingi Theischinger, 1996
- P. pirioni (Alexander, 1928)
- P. praesignis (Alexander, 1930)
- P. puella Alexander, 1924
- P. punctipennis (Westwood, 1836)
- P. rara (Alexander, 1929)
- P. remingtoni (Alexander, 1948)
- P. remulsa (Alexander, 1928)
- P. rieki Theischinger, 1996
- P. serraticornis (Alexander, 1923)
- P. setulicornis (Alexander, 1928)
- P. shewani (Alexander, 1929)
- P. signifera (Alexander, 1931)
- P. skusei (Hutton, 1902)
- P. stolida (Alexander, 1930)
- P. stradbrokensis Alexander, 1978
- P. stygipes (Alexander, 1929)
- P. styligera (Alexander, 1930)
- P. subfuscata (Alexander, 1921)
- P. tarra Theischinger, 1996
- P. terania Theischinger, 1996
- P. tortilis Alexander, 1968
- P. unicincta (Alexander, 1928)
- P. victoria (Alexander, 1922)
- P. wataganensis Theischinger, 1996
- P. wilsoniana (Alexander, 1943)
- P. winta Theischinger, 1996
