= Paonias macrops =

Scientific classification
- Domain: Eukaryota
- Kingdom: Animalia
- Phylum: Arthropoda
- Class: Insecta
- Order: Lepidoptera
- Family: Sphingidae
- Genus: Paonias
- Species: P. macrops

Binomial name
- Paonias macrops Gehlen, 1933

Species of moth

Paonias macrops is a species of moth of the family Sphingidae. It is known from Mexico.
