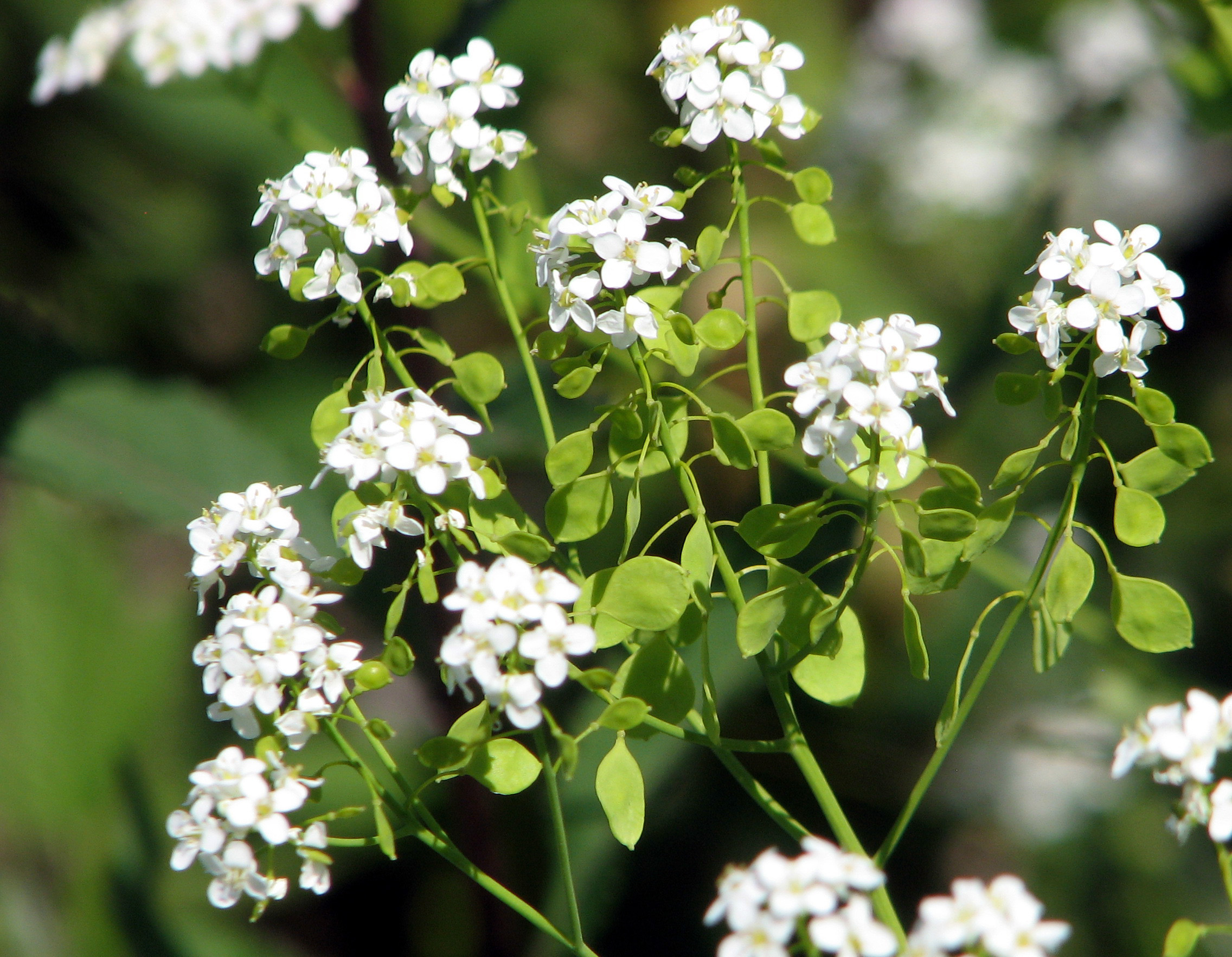

Scientific classification
- Kingdom: Plantae
- Clade: Tracheophytes
- Clade: Angiosperms
- Clade: Eudicots
- Clade: Rosids
- Order: Brassicales
- Family: Brassicaceae
- Genus: Peltaria
- Species: P. alliacea

Binomial name
- Peltaria alliacea Jacq.

Synonyms
- Bohadschia alliacea (Jacq.) Crantz; Clypeola alliacea (Jacq.) Poir.; Clypeola perennis Ard.; Peltaria perennis (Ard.) Markgr.

= Peltaria alliacea =

Species of flowering plant

Peltaria alliacea, or garlic cress, is a perennial flowering plant in the family Brassicaceae. It is endemic to Albania, Austria, Hungary, Romania and former Yugoslavia. The plant grows up to 60 cm (24 in) and has white flowers from May to July. The plant is glabrous (hairless) with simple, entire leaves. The leaves are ovate, sessile and amplexicaule (having lobes that completely surround the stem). When crushed they smell of garlic, hence the common name. The 3–4 mm (0.12–0.16 in) long white petals are shortly clawed. The orbicular, very flat silicula or seed, is pendent and has a size of about 6 by 6 mm (0.24 by 0.24 in). Its chromosome number is 2n=14 (also: 28, 56).

It was first published and described by Nikolaus Joseph von Jacquin in 'Enum. Stirp. Vindob.' on page 260 in May 1762.

The plant grows in stony areas from Southern Austria (Styria, Lower Austria) to South Romania and Albania. It has become naturalized at a single location on the Isle of Skye in the U.K.

The plant is also grown as a herb or vegetable. The leaves can be used and add a spiciness to salads. Although, they can become bitter in the summer.

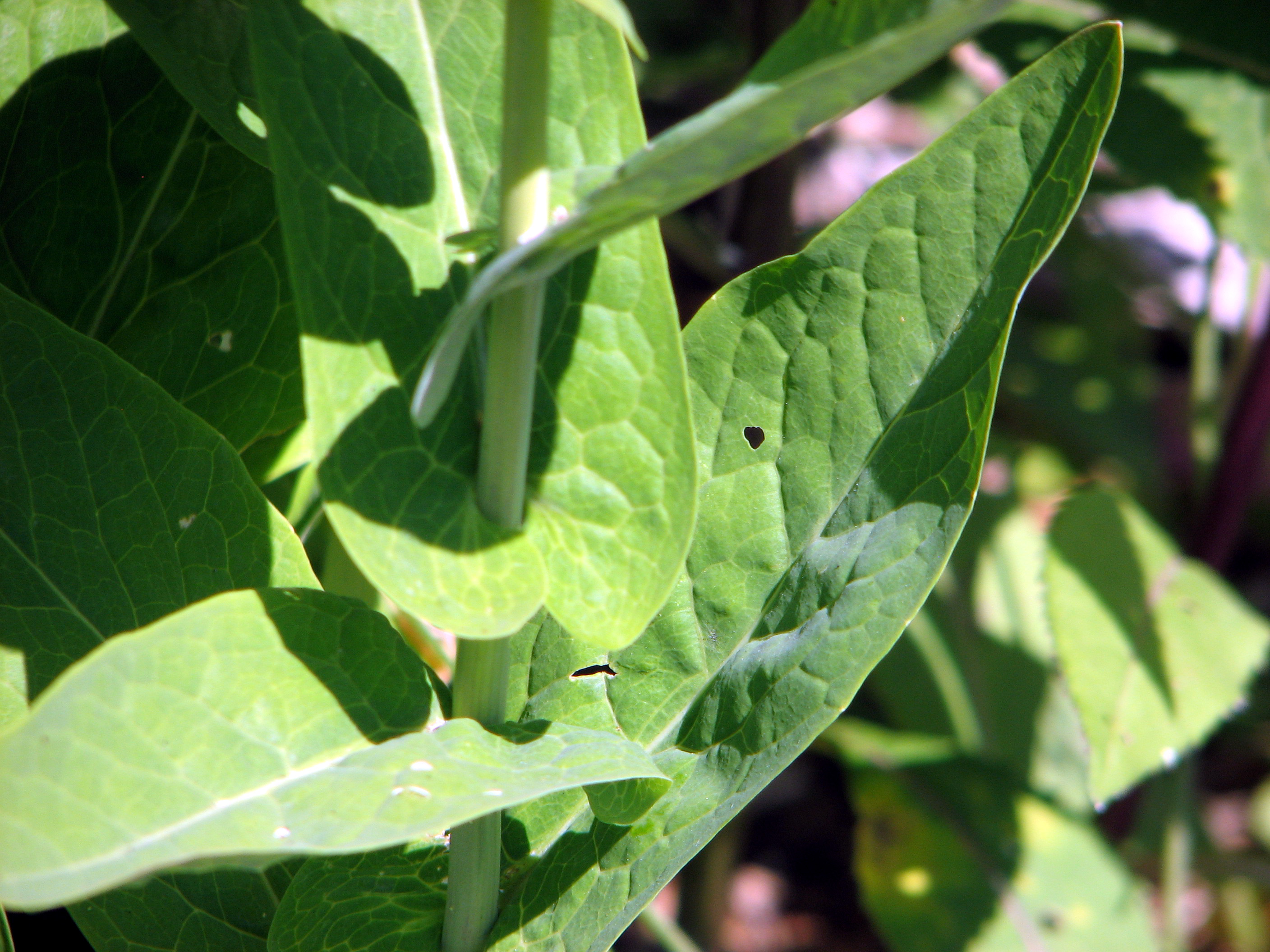
leaves

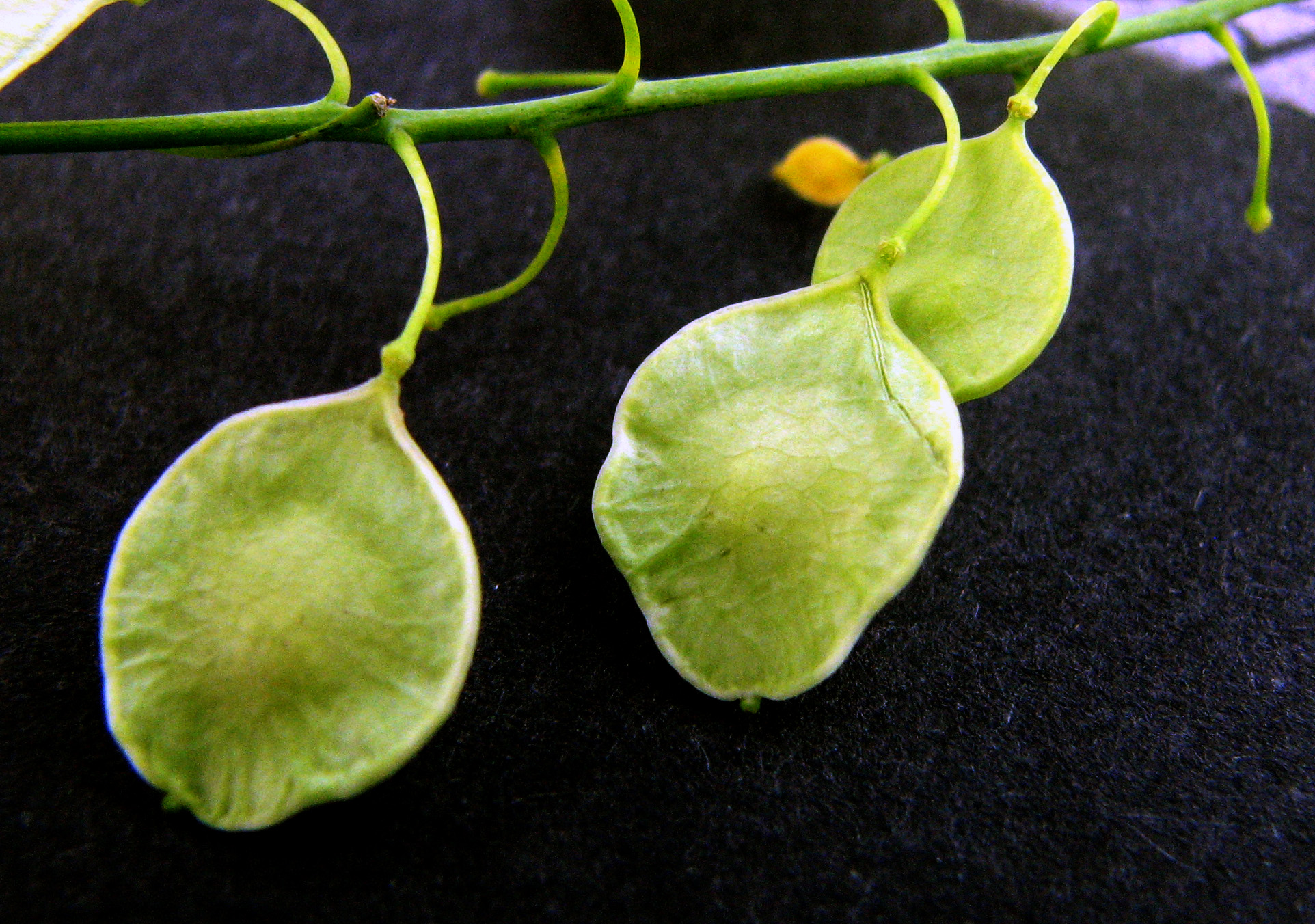
silicula

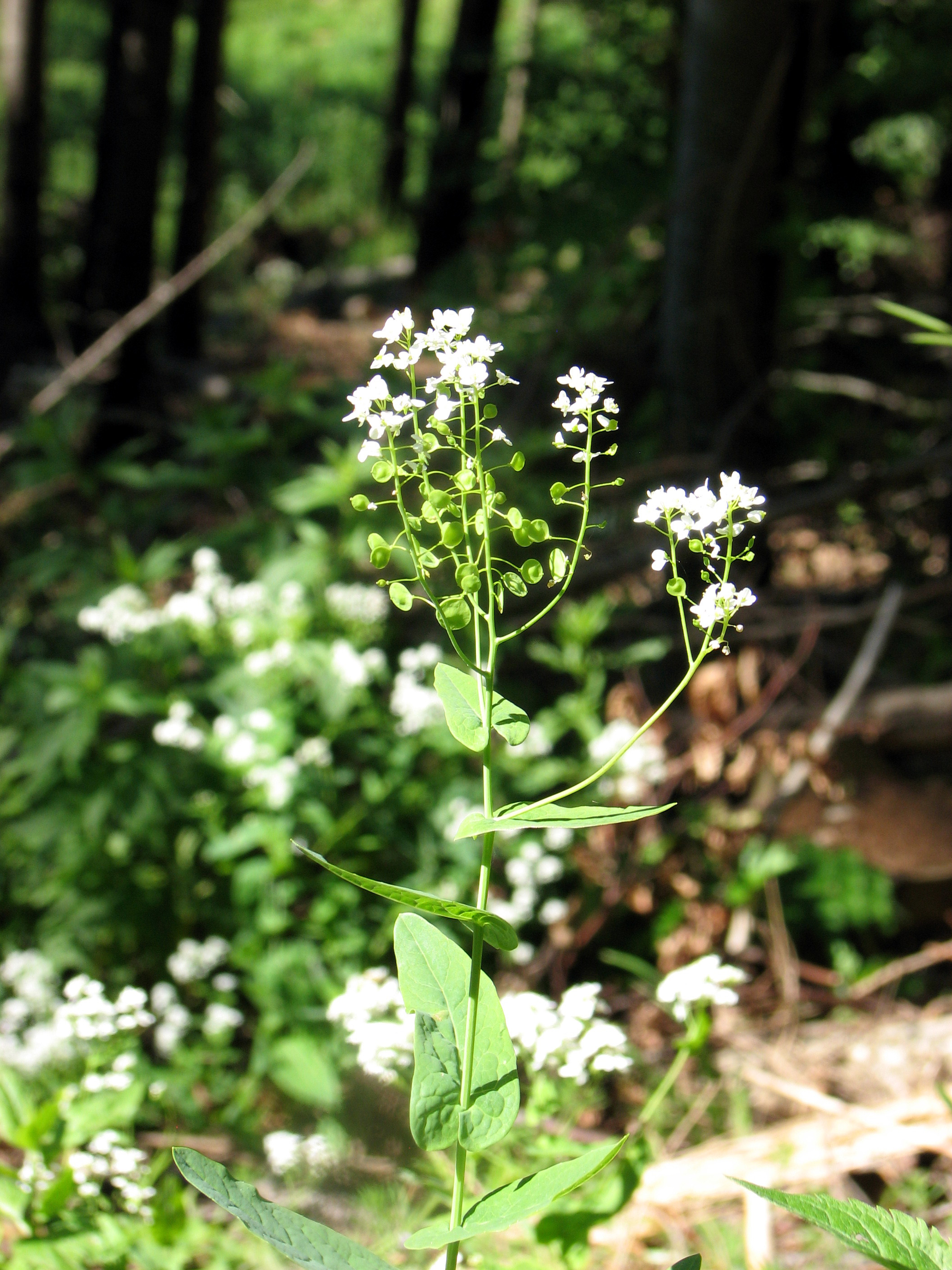
plant habitus

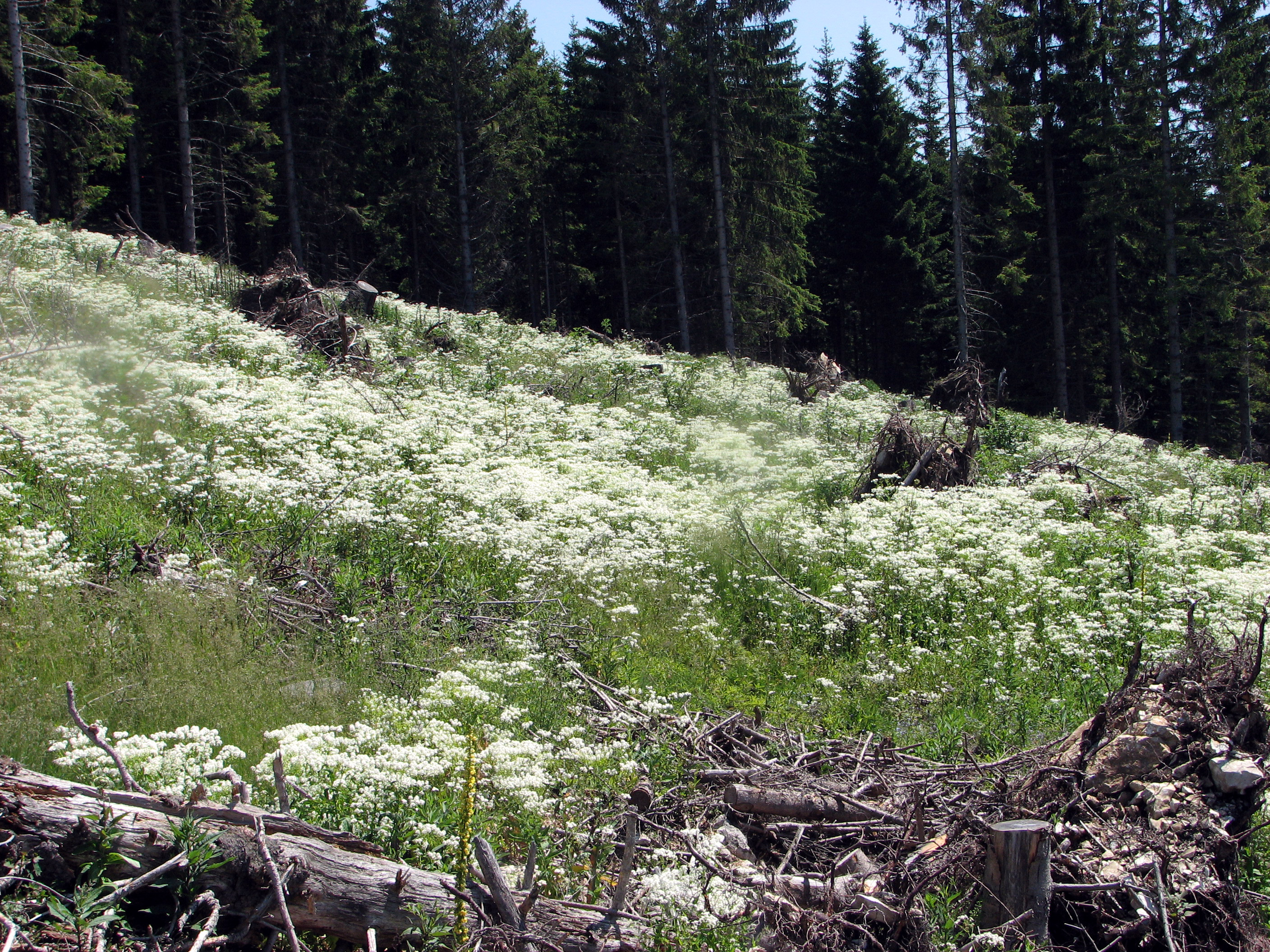
near Graz (Austria)
