= Garlick =

Garlick is the surname of the following people:

- Beverly Garlick (born 1944), Australian architect
- Cathy Garlick, Australian cricketer
- Daniel Garlick (1818–1902), South Australian architect
- Gordon Garlick, English cricketer
- Jessica Garlick, British singer
- Kyle Garlick, American baseball player
- Larry Garlick, American chief executive
- Nicholas Garlick, English catholic priest and martyr
- Raymond Garlick, English poet and editor
- Scott Garlick, American soccer player
- Sean Garlick, Australian rugby league footballer
- Simon Garlick, Australian rules footballer
- Denise Garlick, American politician

== Fictional characters ==
- Magrat Garlick, a witch from Terry Pratchett's Discworld series
- Mirabel Garlick, a witch and herbology professor in Hogwarts Legacy.
