= Paralimnophila emarginata =

Scientific classification
- Kingdom: Animalia
- Phylum: Arthropoda
- Class: Insecta
- Order: Diptera
- Family: Limoniidae
- Genus: Paralimnophila
- Species: P. emarginata

Binomial name
- Paralimnophila emarginata Alexander, 1981

Species of fly

Paralimnophila emarginata is a crane fly species in the genus Paralimnophila. It is found in Chile.
