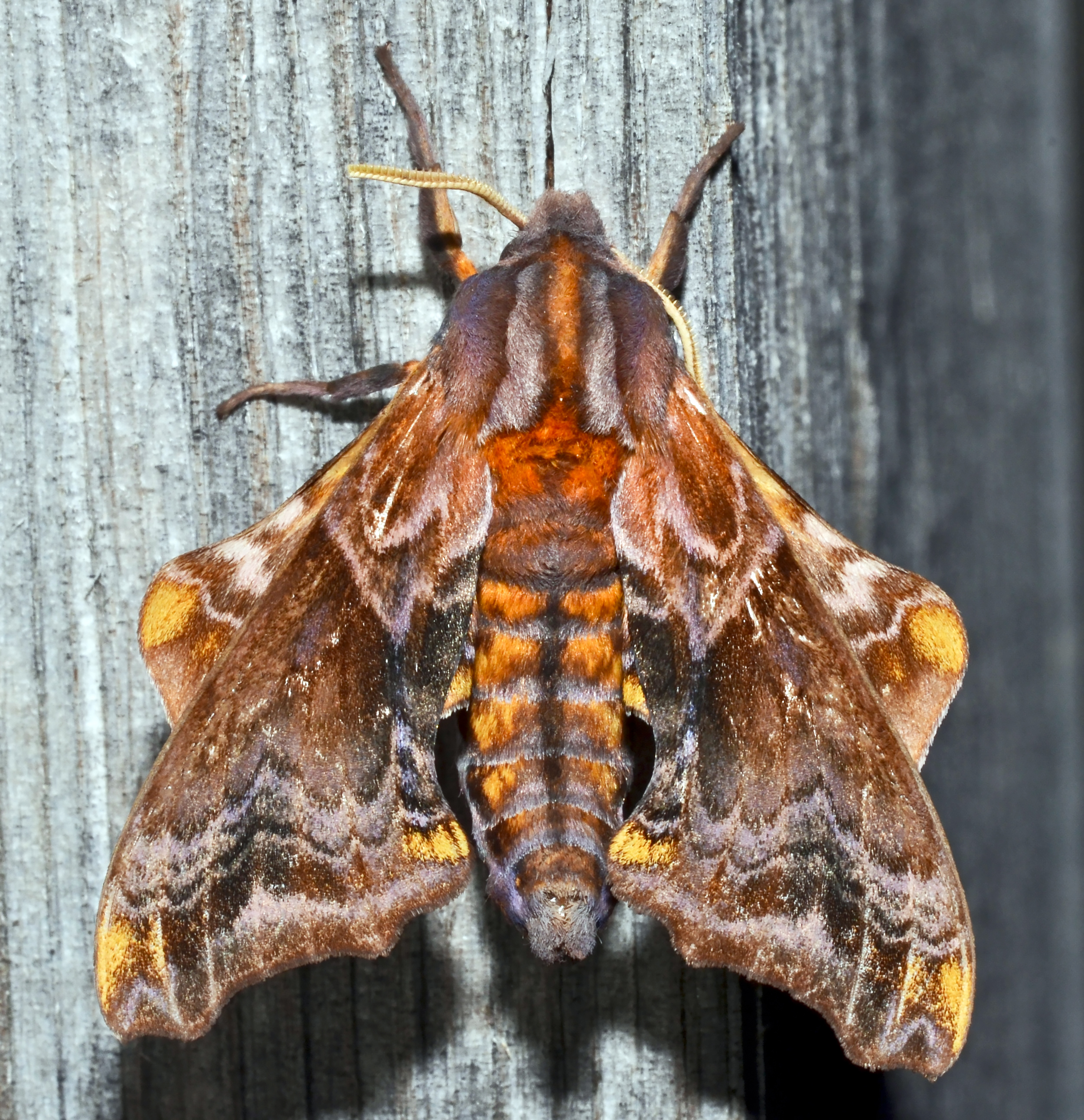

Scientific classification
- Kingdom: Animalia
- Phylum: Arthropoda
- Class: Insecta
- Order: Lepidoptera
- Family: Sphingidae
- Genus: Paonias
- Species: P. myops

Binomial name
- Paonias myops (J. E. Smith, 1797)

Synonyms
- Sphinx myops J. E. Smith, 1797; Smerinthus tiliastri Boisduval, 1875; Smerinthus sorbi Boisduval, 1875; Smerinthus rosacearum Boisduval, 1836; Smerinthus cerasi Boisduval, 1875; Paonias oplerorum Eitschberger, 2002; Paonias hyatti Eitschberger, 2002; Paonias emmeli Eitschberger, 2002; Calasymbolus myops mccrearyi Clark, 1929

= Paonias myops =

Small-eyed sphinx

Species of moth

Paonias myops, the small-eyed sphinx, is a moth of the family Sphingidae. The species was first described by James Edward Smith in 1797.

== Distribution ==
It is found from south-eastern Canada to Florida and westward almost to the Pacific Coast. It is also known from Mexico.

== Description ==
The wingspan is 52–69 mm. Adults are more nocturnal than most sphingids. Adults are on wing from June to September in eastern Canada. In New Jersey, there are two generations per year and there are four generations in Louisiana.

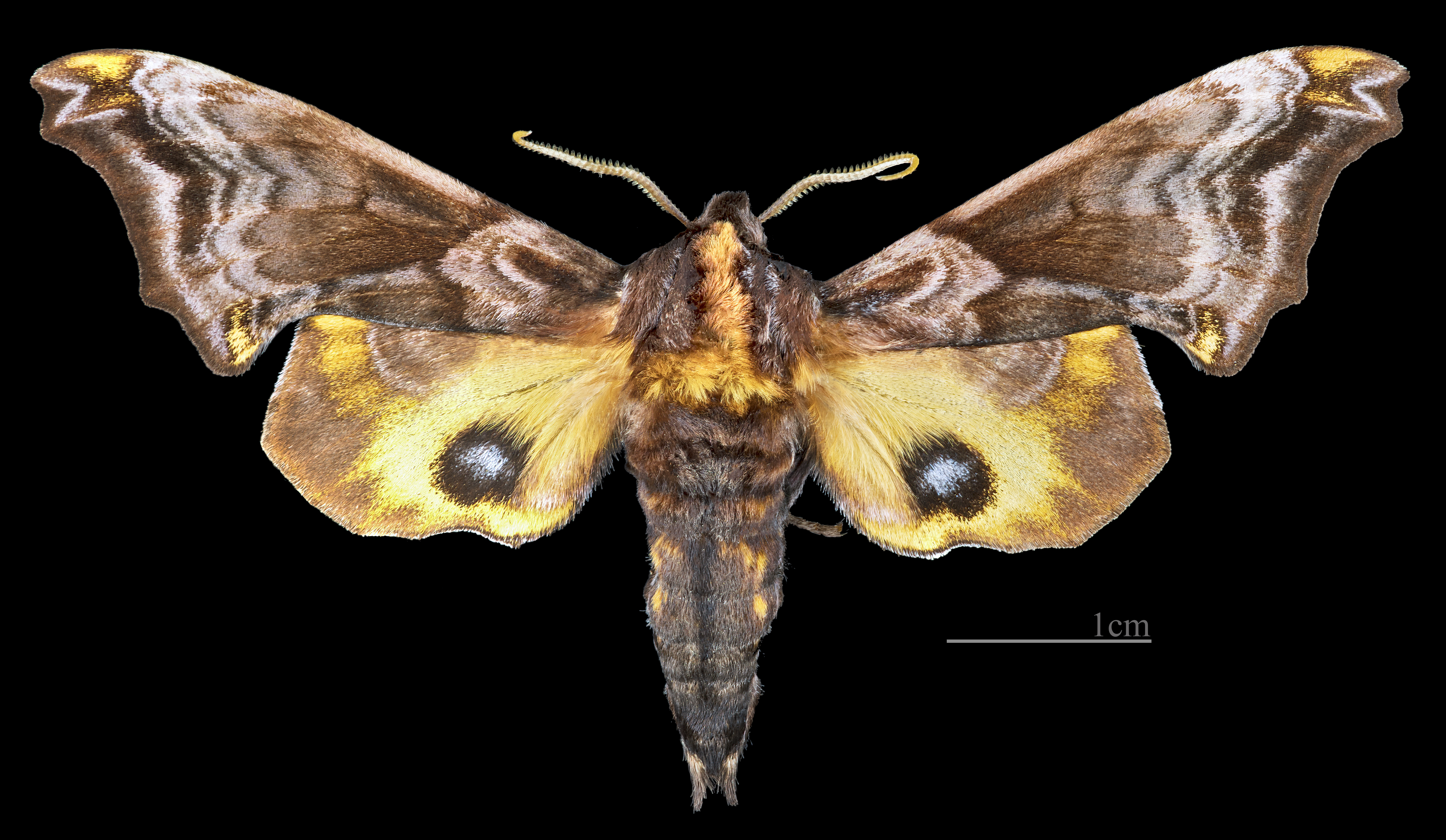
Paonias myops ♂

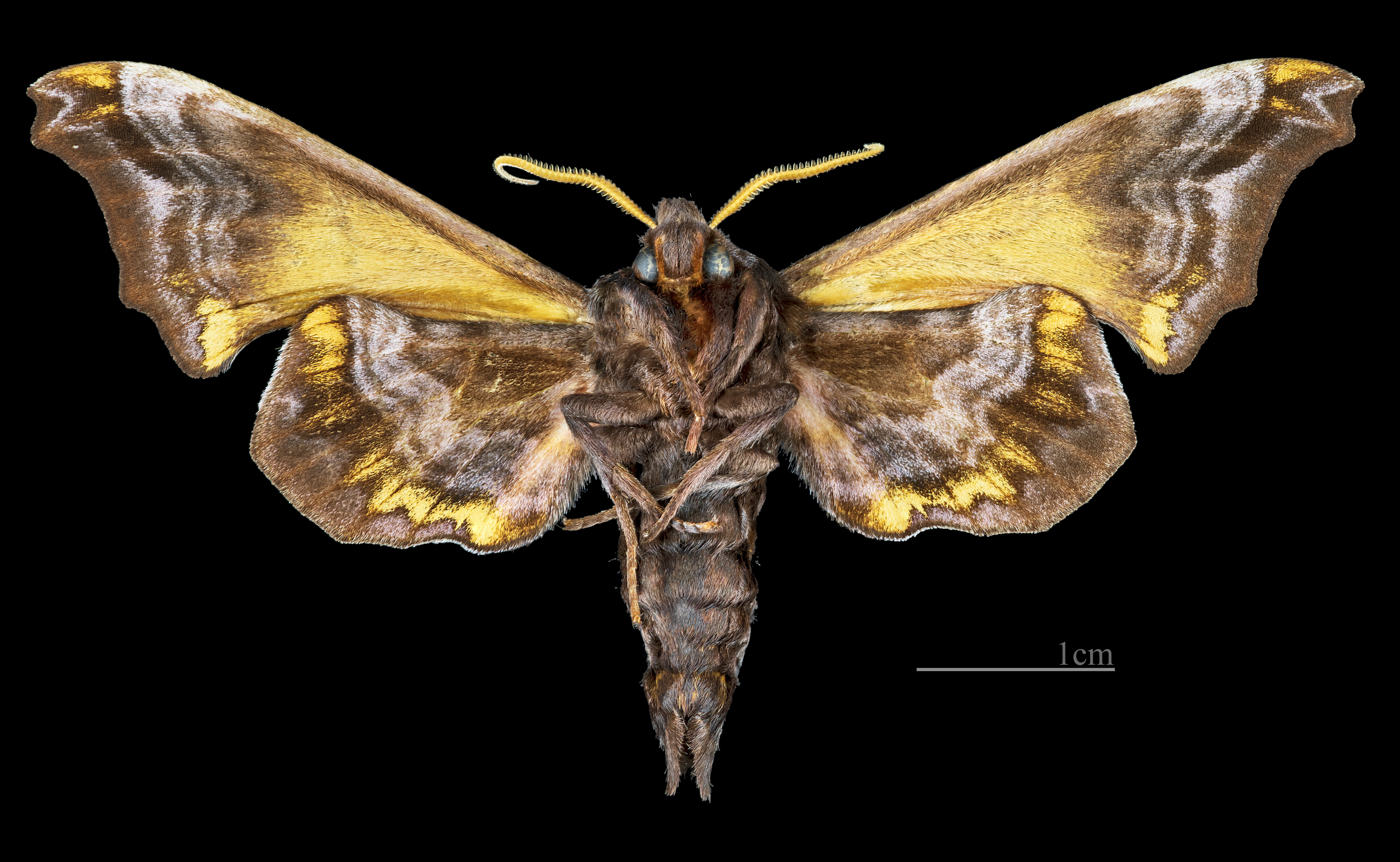
Paonias myops ♂ △

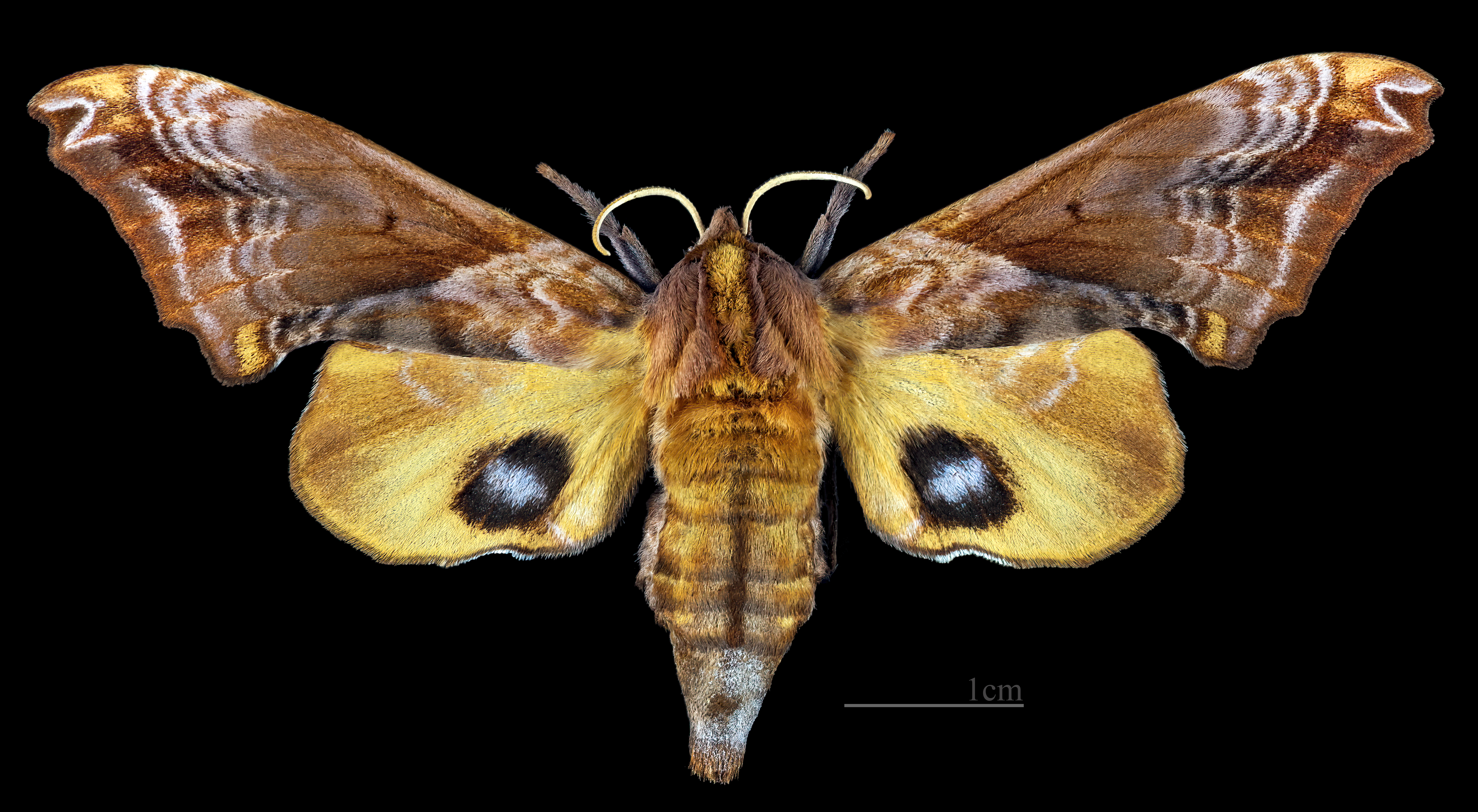
Paonias myops ♀

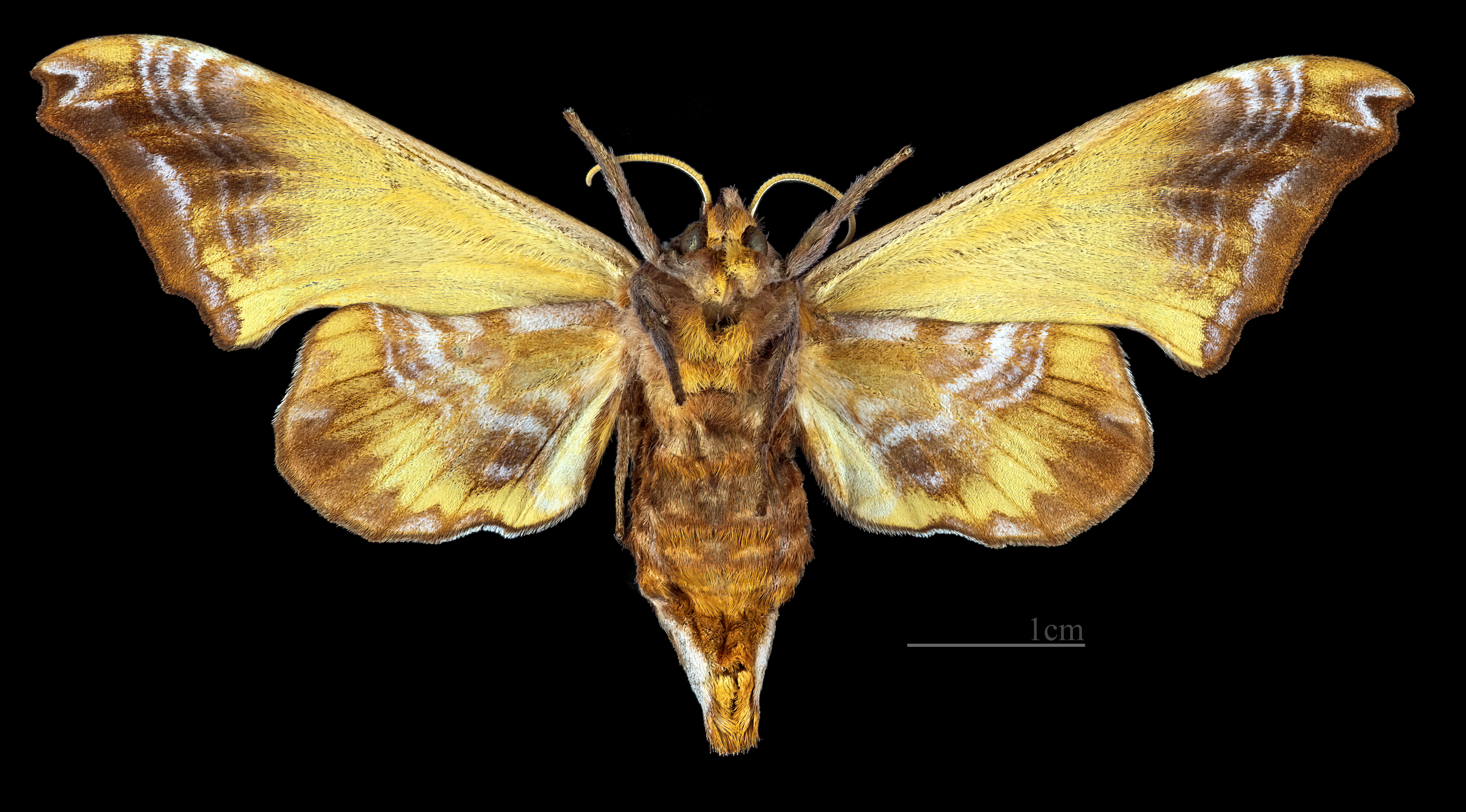
Paonias myops ♀ △

== Subspecies ==
- Paonias myops myops
- Paonias myops occidentalis Clark, 1919 (Mexico)
