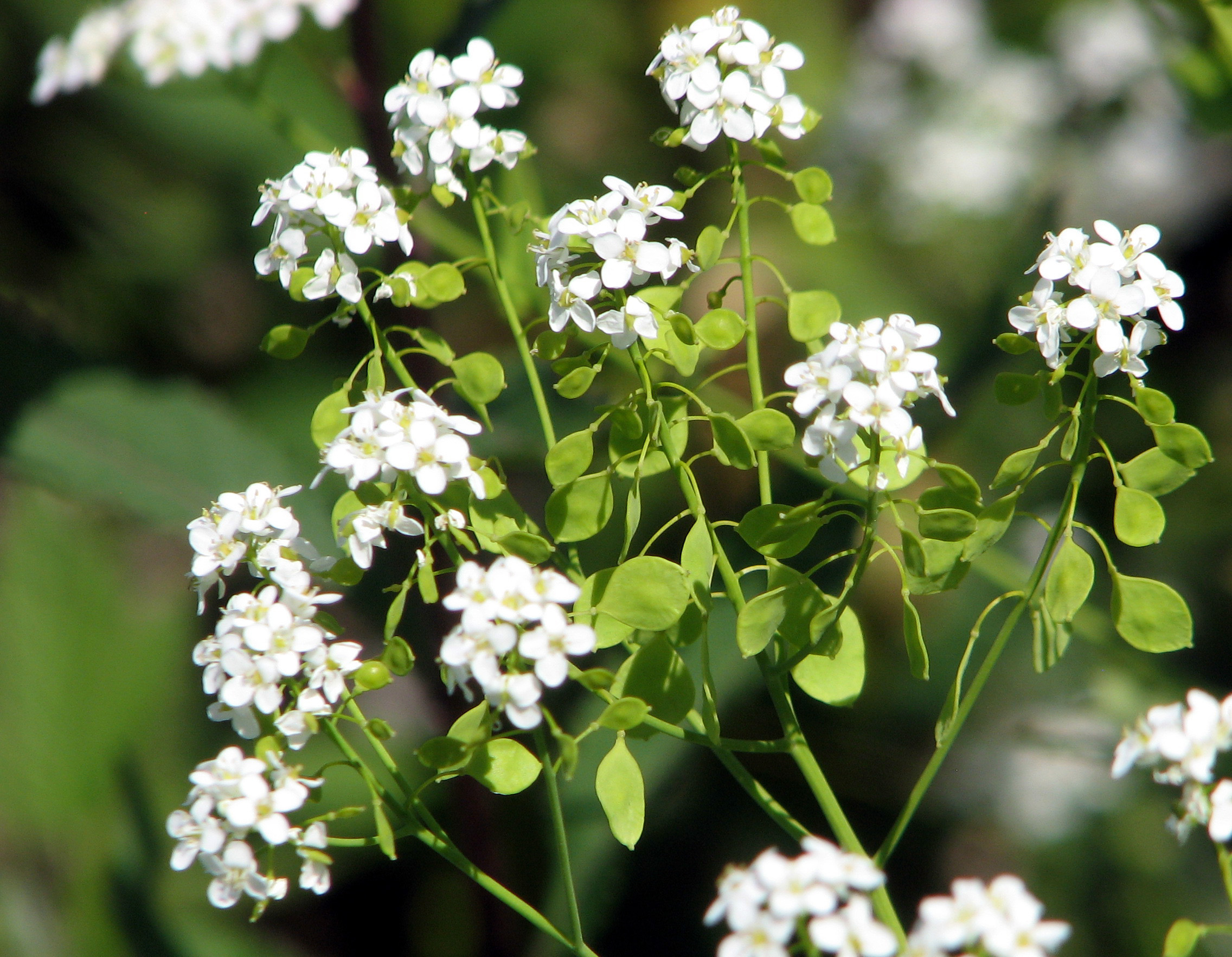
- Peltaria alliacea

Scientific classification
- Kingdom: Plantae
- Clade: Tracheophytes
- Clade: Angiosperms
- Clade: Eudicots
- Clade: Rosids
- Order: Brassicales
- Family: Brassicaceae
- Genus: Peltaria; Jacq.

Species
- See text

= Peltaria =

Genus of flowering plants

Peltaria is a genus of flowering plants in the family Brassicaceae. Their distribution ranges from Southeast Europe, Near East to Central Asia. They prefer rocky slopes.

Peltraria species are perennials with white or rosa flowers. They are glabrous with sessile, entire and simple leaves. Their siliculae are pendent, very flat, on a short decent style.

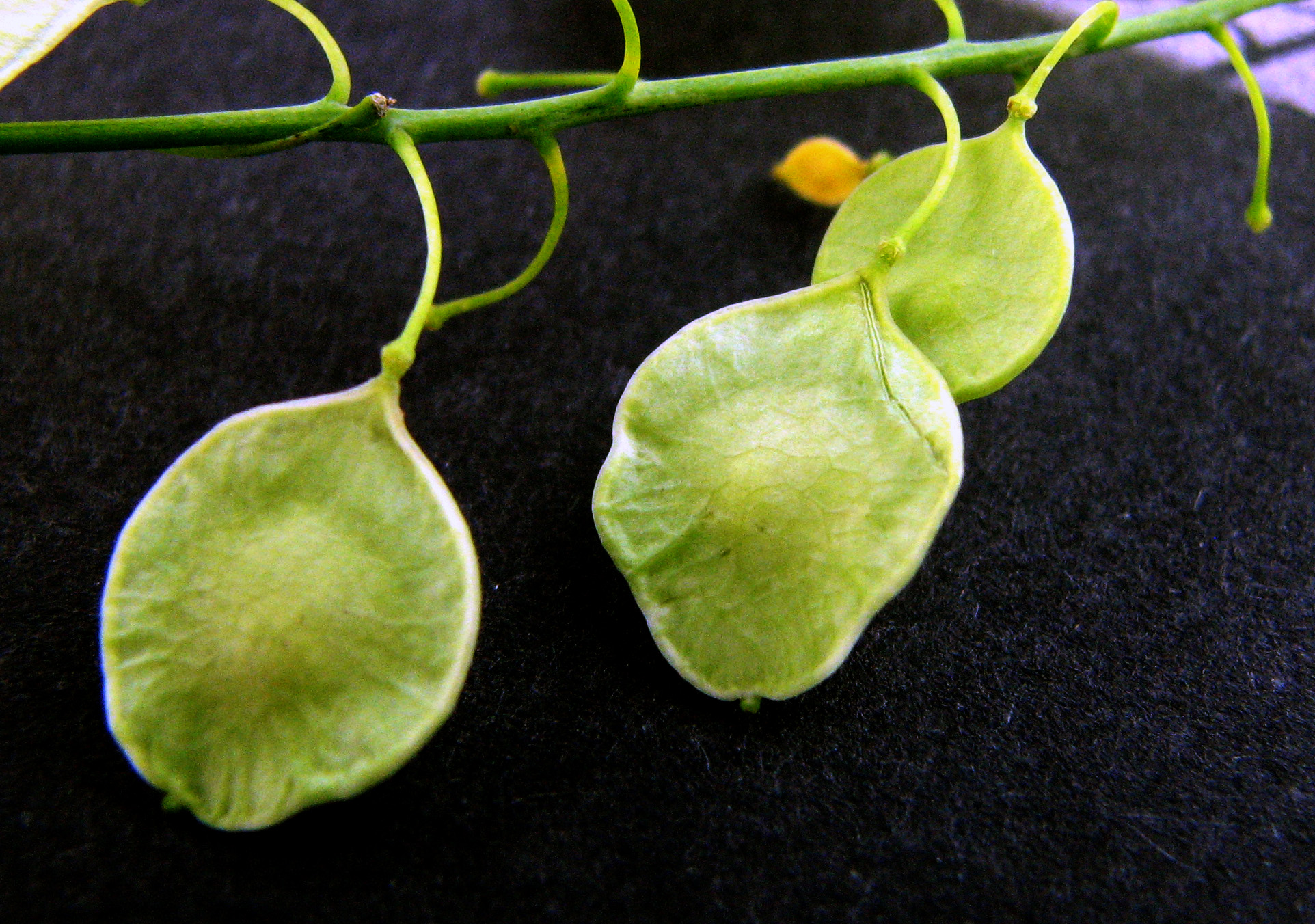
Silicula

According to Warwick, Francis and Al-Shehbaz and Kubitzki this genus comprises four species, two of which occur in Europe.

Species

- Peltaria alliacea Jacq. from Southeast Austria to Romania and Albania, chromosome number 2n=14 (28,56).
- Peltaria angustifolia DC. in the Near East (Israel: Golan, Hermon mountains; Jordan, Iraq, Iran). Further photos in the flora of Israel. Chromosome number 2n=14.
- Peltaria emarginata (Boiss.) Hausskn. (Syn.: Leptoplax emarginata (Boiss.) O.E.Schulz) endemic to Greece. This plant accumulates nickel in its leaves.
- Peltaria turkmena Lipsky in Central Asia. Photo, map. Chromosome number 2n=14.

== Publications ==
- Klaus Kubitzki, Clemens Bayer (Ed.): The Families and Genera of Vascular Plants, Vol.V. SpringerPubl., Berlin 2002, ISBN 978-3-540-42873-2
- Thomas Gaskell Tutin et al. (Ed.): Flora Europaea: Psilotaceae to Platanaceae, Vol. 1. Cambridge University Press, Cambridge (UK) 1980, ISBN 0-521-41007-X
- Roger D. Reeves, Robert R. Brooks, J.Robert Press: Nickel accumulation by species of Peltaria Jacq. (Cruciferae). In: Taxon Vol. 29, 1980, p. 629-633.
- S.I. Warwick, I.A. Al-Shehbaz: Brassicaceae: Chromosome number index and database on CD-Rom. In: Plant Systematics and Evolution. Vol. 259, 2006, p. 237–248. DOI 10.1007/s00606-006-0421-1
- S.I. Warwick, A. Francis, I.A. Al-Shehbaz: Brassicaceae: Species checklist and database on CD-Rom. In: Plant Systematics and Evolution, Vol. 259, 2006, p. 249-258. DOI 10.1007/s00606-006-0422-0
- Global Biodiversity Information Facility
