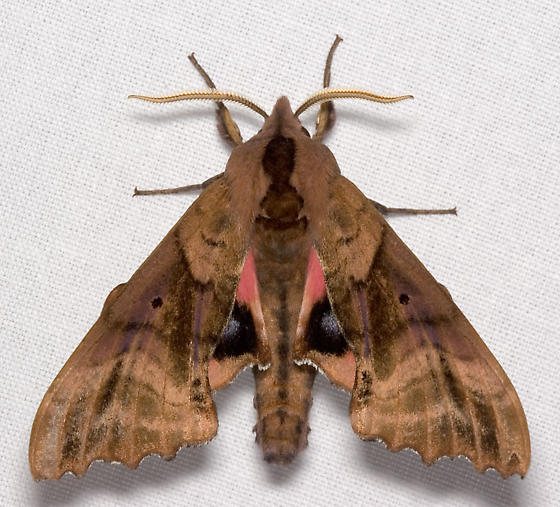

Scientific classification
- Kingdom: Animalia
- Phylum: Arthropoda
- Class: Insecta
- Order: Lepidoptera
- Family: Sphingidae
- Genus: Paonias
- Species: P. excaecata

Binomial name
- Paonias excaecata (J. E. Smith, 1797)

Synonyms
- Sphinx excaecata J.E. Smith, 1797; Paonias pavonina Geyer, 1837; Calasymbolus excaecata borealis Clark, 1929; Calasymbolus excaecata pecosensis Cockerell, 1905

= Paonias excaecatus =

Blinded sphinx

Species of moth

Paonias excaecata, the blinded sphinx, is a moth of the family Sphingidae. The species was first described by James Edward Smith in 1797.

== Distribution ==
It is found in Nova Scotia, New Brunswick and Prince Edward Island, and across the rest of Canada all the way to British Columbia. In the United States it ranges south to Florida in the east, and westward to eastern California and as far south as central Texas.

== Description ==
The wingspan is 60–85 mm. Adult moths are nocturnal; after a brief bout of activity after dusk, they seem to prefer the later hours of the night.

The eggs are greenish yellow and small. Hornworms hatch after about 8 days. Primary food sources for the larvae are deciduous trees such as willows, birch and cherries, as well as shrubberies, like ninebark and roses. Like the rest of the family Sphingidae, they burrow shallowly into soil to pupate. Once they leave their pupa, the adults almost immediately mate. Adults do not feed.

== Gallery ==
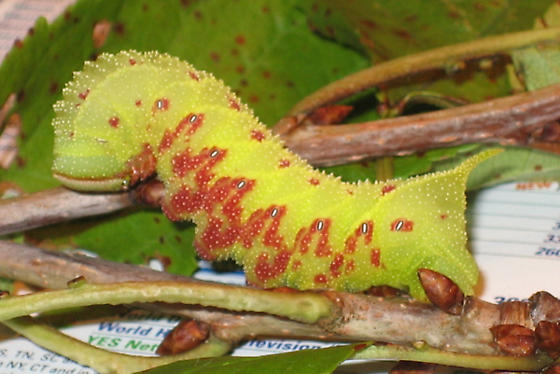
Caterpillar

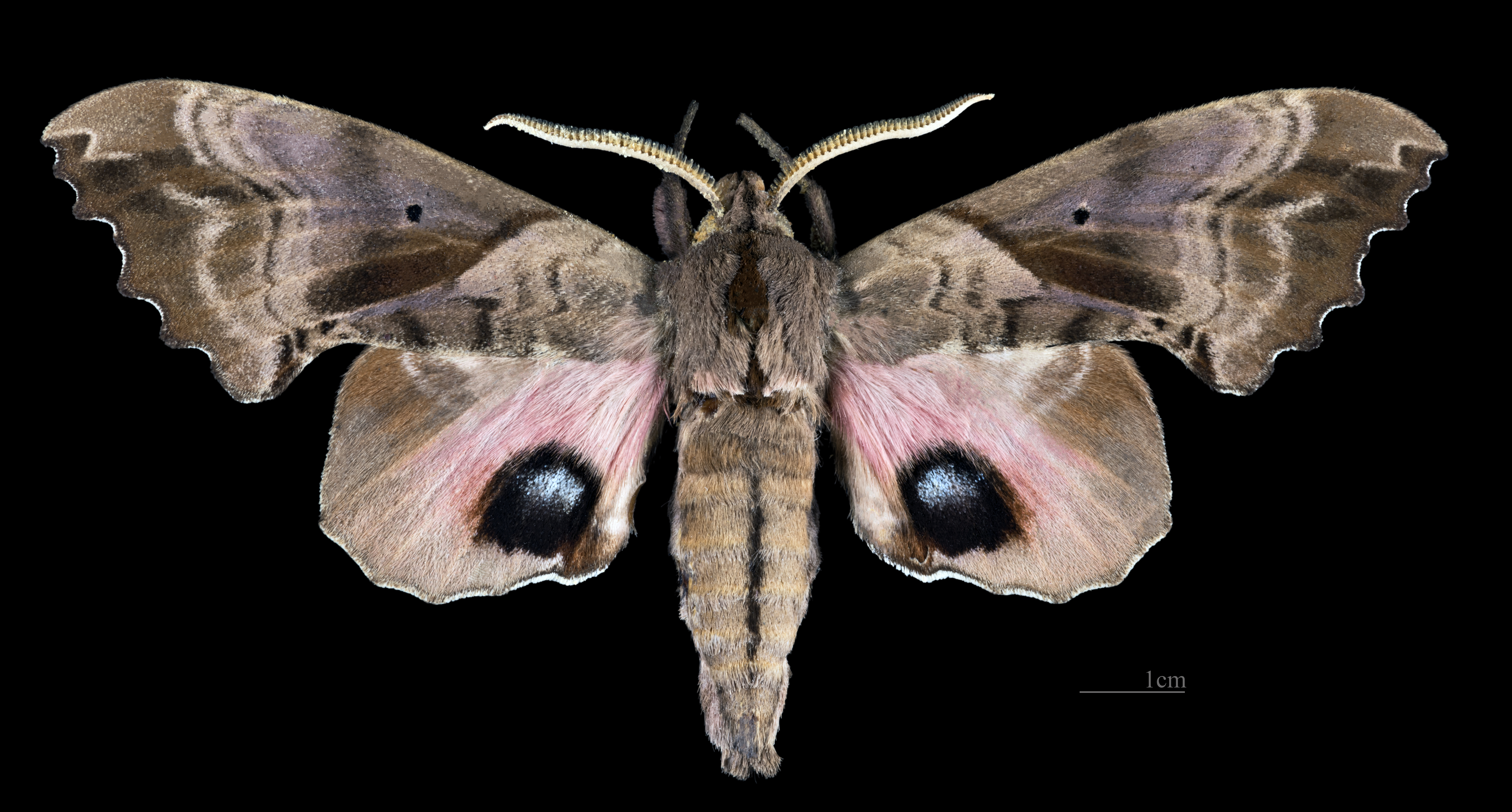
Male, dorsal view

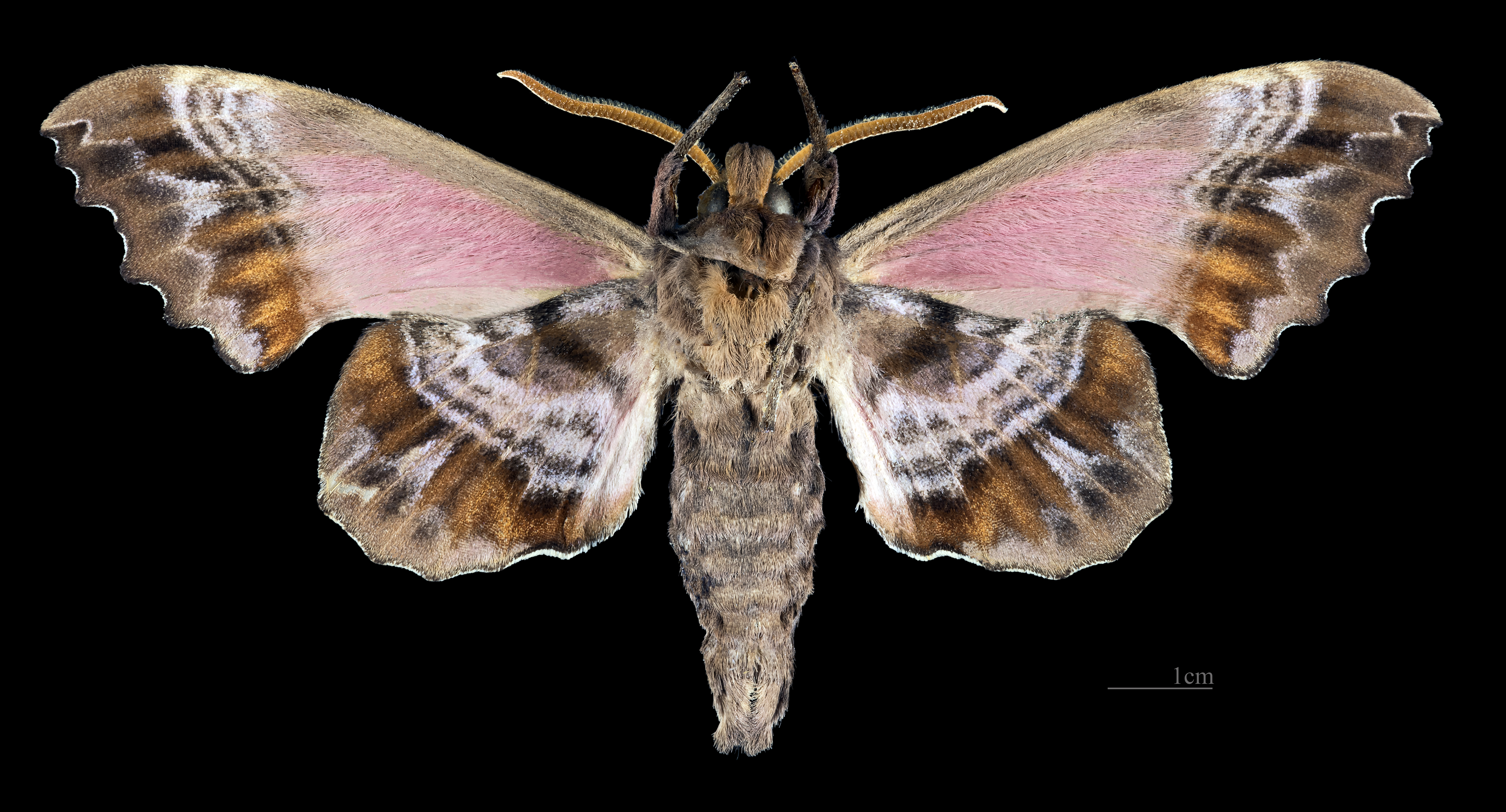
Male, ventral view

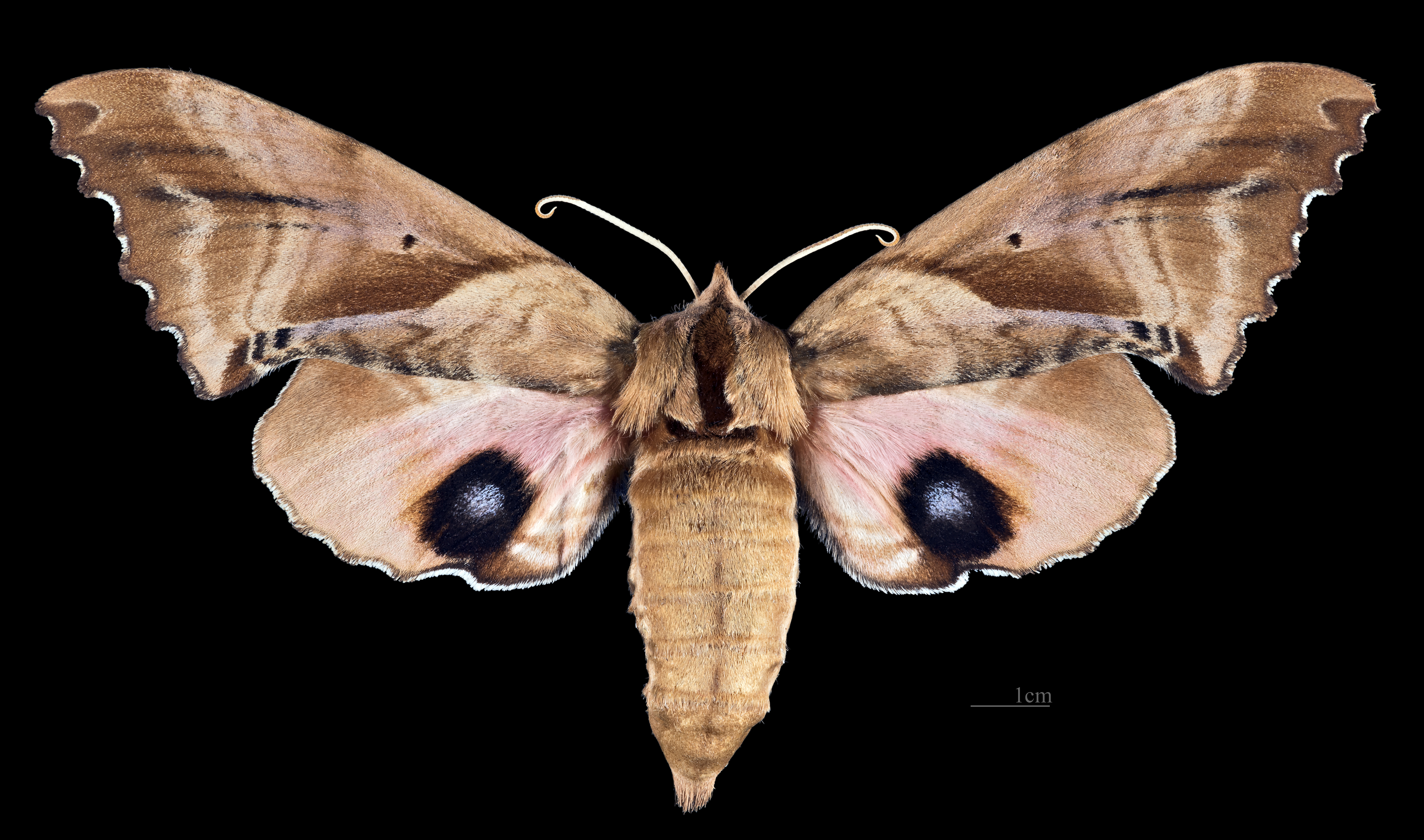
Female, dorsal view

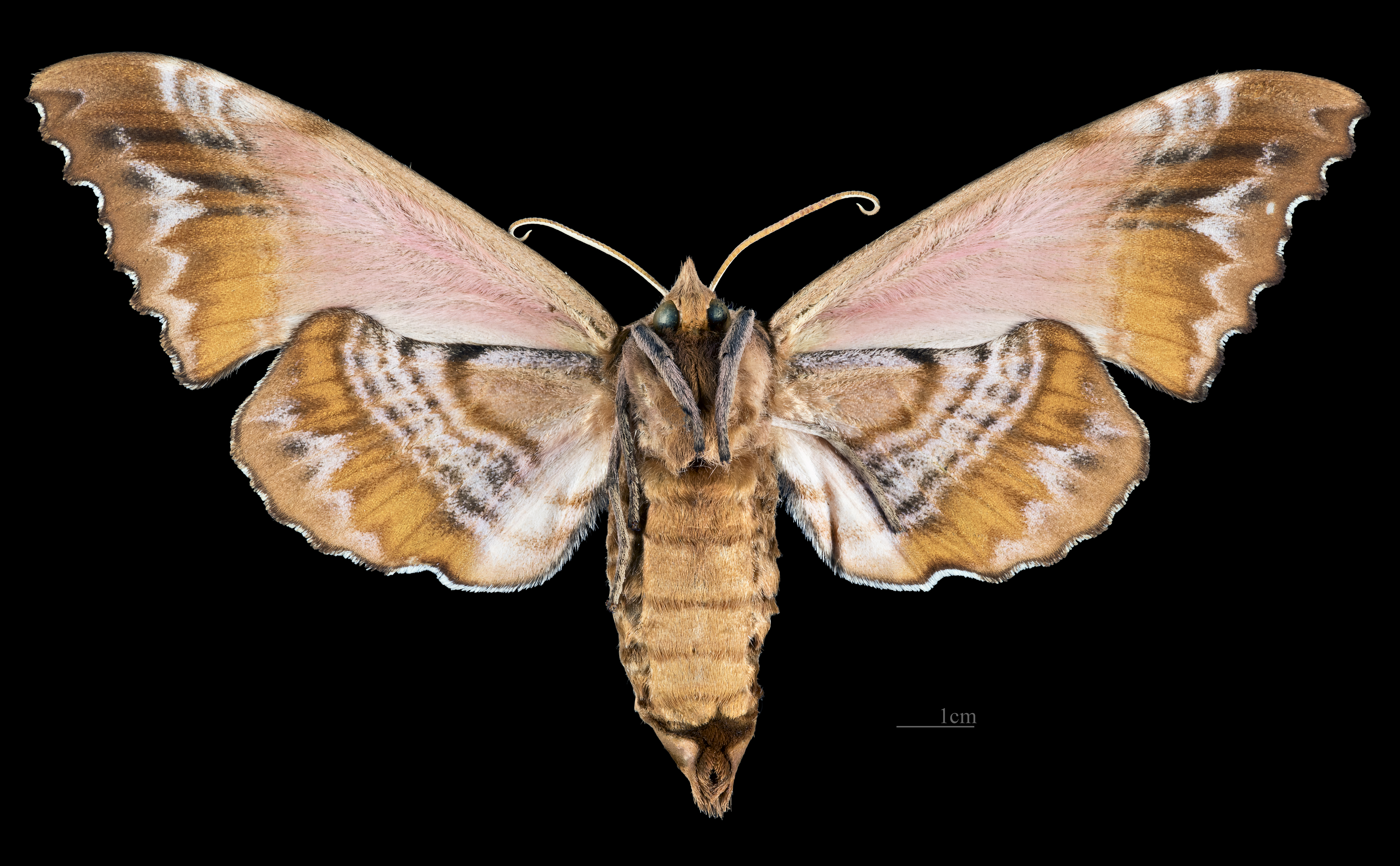
Female, ventral view
