= Garlic Island =

Island in Winnebago, Wisconsin

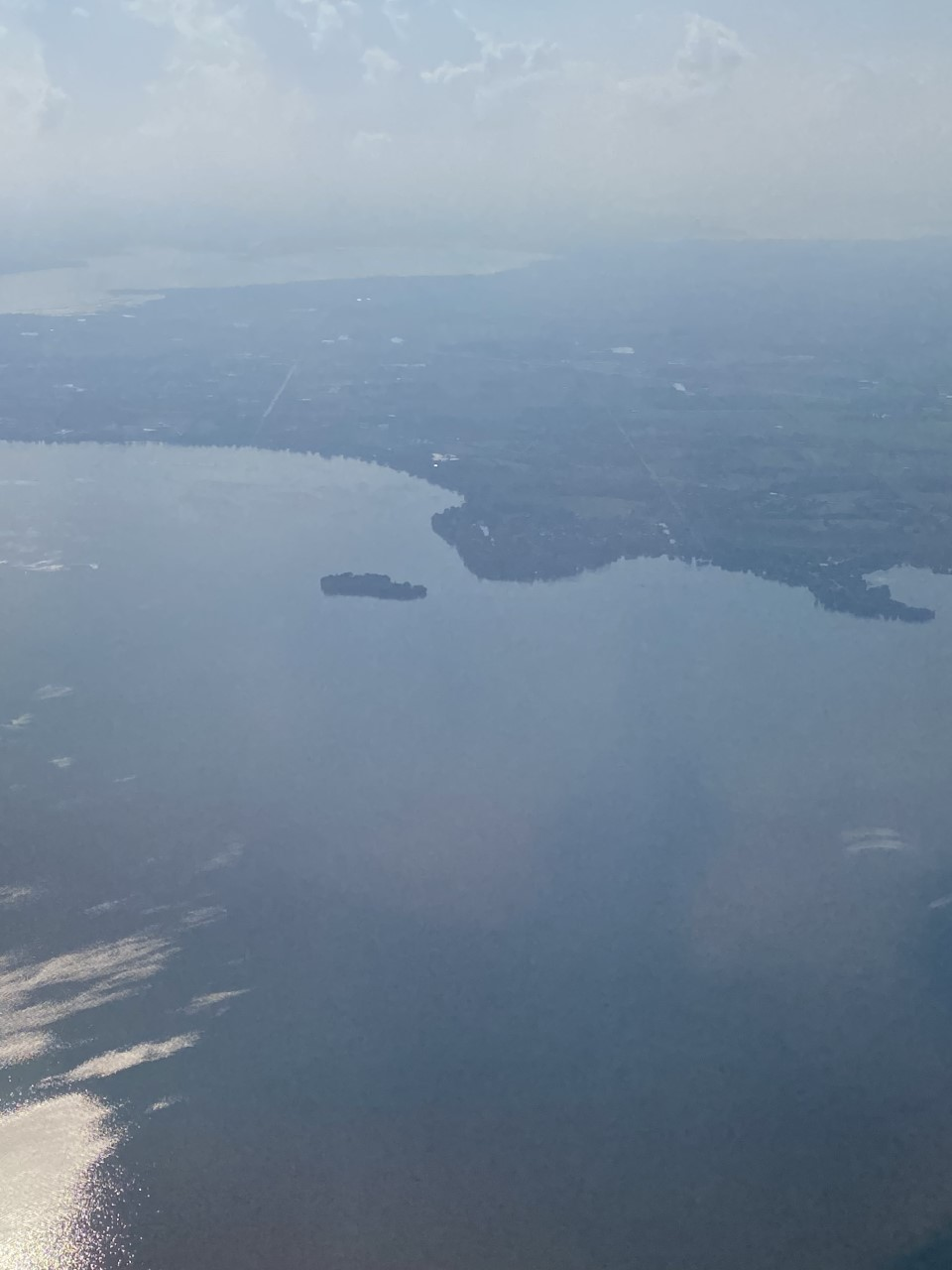
- Aerial shot of Garlic Island in Lake Winnebago.

- Location within Wisconsin Location within the United States

Geography
- Location: Lake Winnebago
- Coordinates: 44°05′19″N 88°28′54″W
- Area: 8.5 acres (3.4 ha)
- Highest elevation: 751 ft (228.9 m)

Administration
- United States
- State: Wisconsin
- County: Winnebago
- Town: Oshkosh

Garlic Island, or Island Park, is an island in Winnebago County, Wisconsin. The island is located in Lake Winnebago near its west shoreline. The entirety of the island is in the town of Oshkosh. Garlic Island was the wintering site of a British Encampment during the War of 1812. This encampment was led by Col. Robert Dickson, and suffered greatly during the winter of 1813.

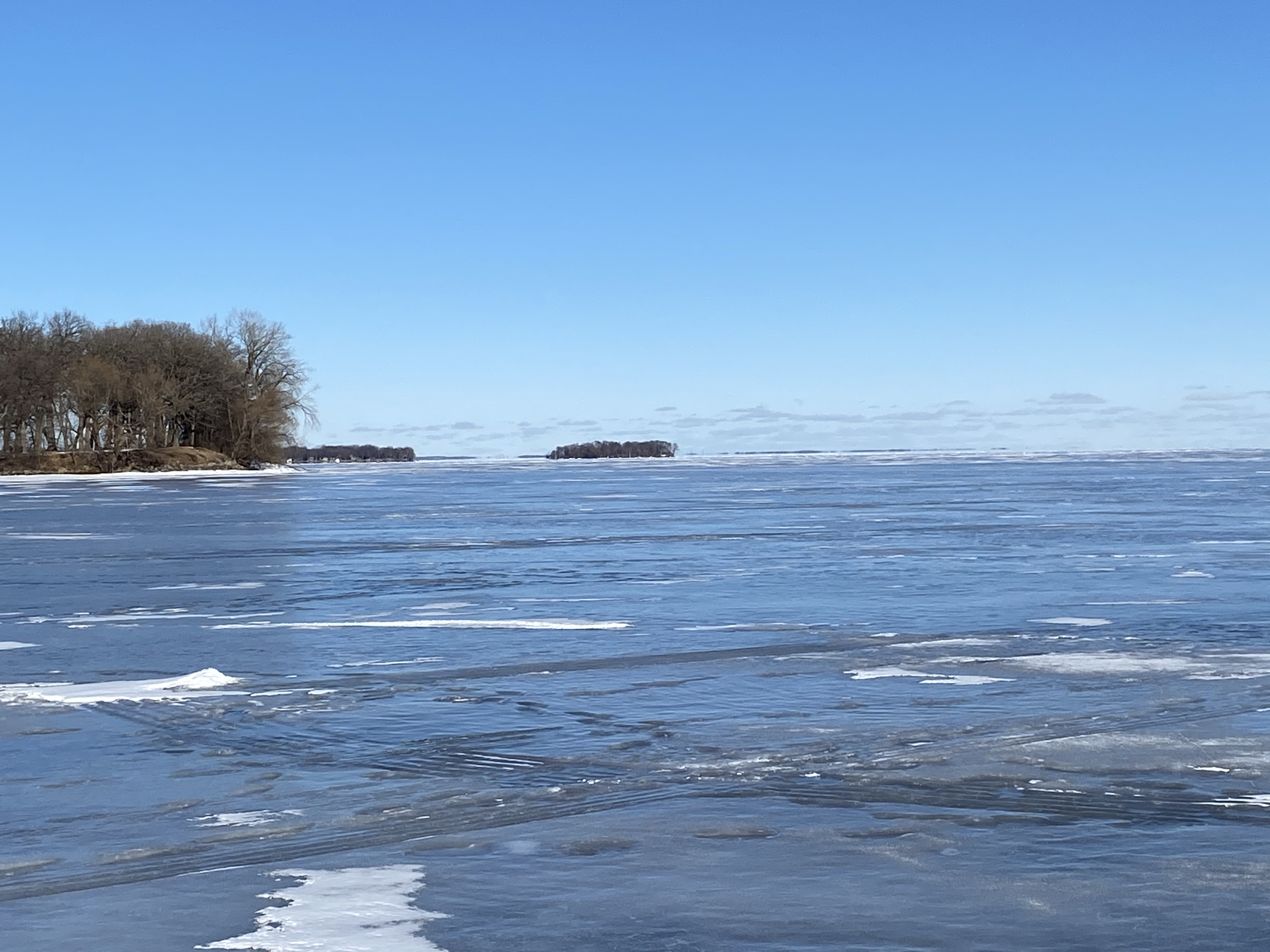
Frozen Lake Winnebago 2021.
