= Texas's 21st congressional district =

U.S. House district for Texas

Coordinates: 30°03′28″N 98°58′31″W

- Interactive map of district boundaries
- Representative: Chip Roy; R–Dripping Springs
- Distribution: 78.15% urban; 21.85% rural
- Population (2025): 854,780
- Median household income: $102,295
- Ethnicity: 58.9% White; 30.7% Hispanic; 3.6% Two or more races; 3.4% Black; 2.6% Asian; 0.8% other
- Cook PVI: R+11

Texas's 21st congressional district of the United States House of Representatives serves the area north of San Antonio and a significant portion of Austin in the state of Texas. Towns entirely or partially in this district include Boerne, Fredericksburg, Ingram, Kerrville, Kyle, New Braunfels, and San Marcos. The current Representative from the 21st district is Chip Roy; he will be succeeded by Mark Teixeira in January 2027, after Teixeira's win in the 2026 midterm elections.

The district was created in 1934, and has always been anchored in the Texas Hill Country and northern San Antonio. However, until the early 1980s, it stretched for some distance into West Texas, as far as Big Bend National Park. It began shifting away from its Yellow Dog Democrat roots in the late 1960s, though it took until 1978 for a Republican to win it. The GOP has held it ever since, in large part due to the increased growth of the San Antonio suburbs. The district was pushed into the Austin area in the 1980 census; until the 2000s it included fast-growing Round Rock.

== Recent election results from statewide races ==
=== 2023–2027 boundaries ===
Year	Office	Results
2008	President	McCain 65–35%
2012	President	Romney 69–31%
2014	Senate	Cornyn 74–26%
2014	Governor	Abbott 69–31%
2016	President	Trump 61–33%
2018	Senate	Cruz 60–39%
2018	Governor	Abbott 65–33%
2018	Lt. Governor	Patrick 60–37%
2018	Attorney General	Paxton 59–38%
2018	Comptroller of Public Accounts	Hegar 63–33%
2020	President	Trump 59–39%
2020	Senate	Cornyn 62–36%
2022	Governor	Abbott 61–38%
2022	Lt. Governor	Patrick 60–37%
2022	Attorney General	Paxton 59–38%
2022	Comptroller of Public Accounts	Hegar 63–34%
2024	President	Trump 61–38%
2024	Senate	Cruz 59–39%

=== 2027–2033 boundaries ===
Year	Office	Results
2008	President	McCain 63–36%
2012	President	Romney 67–33%
2014	Senate	Cornyn 73–27%
2014	Governor	Abbott 68–32%
2016	President	Trump 59–35%
2018	Senate	Cruz 57–42%
2018	Governor	Abbott 63–36%
2018	Lt. Governor	Patrick 58–39%
2018	Attorney General	Paxton 57–40%
2018	Comptroller of Public Accounts	Hegar 60–36%
2020	President	Trump 58–41%
2020	Senate	Cornyn 60–38%
2022	Governor	Abbott 60–39%
2022	Lt. Governor	Patrick 59–38%
2022	Attorney General	Paxton 58–39%
2022	Comptroller of Public Accounts	Hegar 62–36%
2024	President	Trump 60–38%
2024	Senate	Cruz 58–40%
2026	Senate	Paxton 50–47%
2026	Governor	Abbott 53–47%

== Current composition ==
For the 118th and successive Congresses (based on redistricting following the 2020 census), the district contains all or portions of the following counties and communities:

Bandera County (3)

All 3 communities

Bexar County (8)

Alamo Heights, Castle Hills, Hill Country Village, Hollywood Park, Olmos Park (part; also 35th), San Antonio (part; also 20th, 23rd, 28th, 35th; shared with Comal and Medina counties), Terrell Hills, Windcrest

Blanco County (3)

All 3 communities

Comal County (8)

Bulverde, Canyon Lake, Fair Oaks Ranch (part; also 23rd; shared with Bexar and Kendall counties), Garden Ridge, New Braunfels (part; also 15th, 28th, and 35th; shared with Guadalupe County), San Antonio (part; also 20th, 23rd, 28th, 35th; shared with Bexar and Medina counties), Schertz (part; also 28th and 35th; shared with Bexar and Guadalupe counties), Spring Branch

Gillespie County (3)

All 3 communities

Hays County (12)

Austin (part; also 10th, 35th, and 37th; shared with Travis and Williamson counties), Bear Creek, Belterra, Buda (part; also 35th), Driftwood, Dripping Springs, Hays, Kyle (part; also 35th), Mountain City, San Marcos (part; also 27th and 35th; shared with Caldwell and Guadalupe counties), Wimberley, Woodcreek

Kendall County (3)

All 3 communities

Kerr County (3)

All 3 communities

Real County (2)

Camp Wood, Leakey

Travis County (2)

Austin (part; also 10th, 35th, and 37th; shared with Hays and Williamson counties), Barton Creek

== Future composition ==
Beginning with the 2026 election, the 21st district will consist of the following counties:

- Bandera
- Bexar (part)
- Blanco
- Comal
- Gillespie
- Hays (part)
- Kendall
- Kerr
- Real

== List of members representing the district ==
Member	Party	Years	Cong ress	Electoral history
District established January 3, 1935
Charles L. South (Coleman)	Democratic	January 3, 1935 – January 3, 1943	74th 75th 76th 77th	Elected in 1934. Re-elected in 1936. Re-elected in 1938. Re-elected in 1940. [data missing]
O. C. Fisher (San Angelo)	Democratic	January 3, 1943 – December 31, 1974	78th 79th 80th 81st 82nd 83rd 84th 85th 86th 87th 88th 89th 90th 91st 92nd 93rd	Elected in 1942. Re-elected in 1944. Re-elected in 1946. Re-elected in 1948. Re-elected in 1950. Re-elected in 1952. Re-elected in 1954. Re-elected in 1956. Re-elected in 1958. Re-elected in 1960. Re-elected in 1962. Re-elected in 1964. Re-elected in 1966. Re-elected in 1968. Re-elected in 1970. Re-elected in 1972. Retired.
Vacant		December 31, 1974 – January 3, 1975	93rd	
Bob Krueger (New Braunfels)	Democratic	January 3, 1975 – January 3, 1979	94th 95th	Elected in 1974. Re-elected in 1976. Retired to run for U.S. Senator.
Tom Loeffler (Hunt)	Republican	January 3, 1979 – January 3, 1987	96th 97th 98th 99th	Elected in 1978. Re-elected in 1980. Re-elected in 1982. Re-elected in 1984. [data missing]
Lamar Smith (San Antonio)	Republican	January 3, 1987 – January 3, 2019	100th 101st 102nd 103rd 104th 105th 106th 107th 108th 109th 110th 111th 112th 113th 114th 115th	Elected in 1986. Re-elected in 1988. Re-elected in 1990. Re-elected in 1992. Re-elected in 1994. Re-elected in 1996. Re-elected in 1998. Re-elected in 2000. Re-elected in 2002. Re-elected in 2004. Re-elected in 2006. Re-elected in 2008. Re-elected in 2010. Re-elected in 2012. Re-elected in 2014. Re-elected in 2016. Retired.
Chip Roy (Dripping Springs)	Republican	January 3, 2019 – present	116th 117th 118th 119th	Elected in 2018. Re-elected in 2020. Re-elected in 2022. Re-elected in 2024. Retiring to run for Attorney General.
Mark Teixeira (Bee Cave)	Republican	Assuming office on January 3, 2027		Elected in 2026.

== Recent election results ==
2004 United States House of Representatives elections in Texas, District 21
Party	Candidate	Votes	%	±%
Republican	Lamar Smith (incumbent)	209,774	61.5%	−11.4%
Democratic	Rhett Smith	121,129	35.5%	+10.2%
Libertarian	Jason Pratt	10,216	3.0%	+1.1%
Majority		88,645	26.0%	
Turnout		341,119		
Republican hold		Swing	-10.8%	

=== 2006 ===
In the case of League of United Latin American Citizens v. Perry, 548 U. S. 399 (2006), the U.S. Supreme Court ruled that the configuration of Texas' 15th, 21st, 23rd, 25th and 28th congressional districts as drawn by the Texas Legislature violated the National Voting Rights Act of 1965. Replacement district boundaries for the 2006 election were subsequently issued for the five districts by the local federal district court, and on election day in November, these five districts had open primaries, with candidates being elected for receiving over 50 percent of the vote. Runoff elections were held in December to decide elections in which no candidate gained an absolute majority in November.

In the 2006 election, Lamar Smith defeated veteran and college administrator John Courage with 60% of the vote.

2006 United States House of Representatives elections in Texas, District 21
Party	Candidate	Votes	%	±%
Republican	Lamar Smith (incumbent)	122,486	60.1%	−1.4%
Democratic	John Courage	49,957	24.51%	−10.99%
Democratic	Gene Kelly	18,355	9%	
Independent	Tommy Ray Calvert Jr	5,280	2.59%	
Libertarian	James Arthur Strohm	4,076	2.0%	−1.0%
Independent	James Lyle Peterson	2,189	1.07%	
Independent	Mark J. Rossano	1,439	0.7%	
Majority				
Turnout		203,782		
Republican hold		Swing		

=== 2008 ===
2008 United States House of Representatives elections in Texas, District 21
Party	Candidate	Votes	%	±%
Republican	Lamar Smith (incumbent)	243,471	79.99%	+19.89%
Libertarian	James Arthur Strohm	60,879	20%	+18%
Majority		182,592		
Turnout		304,350		
Republican hold		Swing		

=== 2010 ===
In the 2010 election, Lamar Smith defeated Lainey Melnick with 68.9 percent of the vote. Melnick, an Austin real estate broker, officially filed papers with the Federal Election Commission on June 23, 2009 to become a candidate.

2010 United States House of Representatives elections in Texas, District 21
Party	Candidate	Votes	%	±%
Republican	Lamar Smith (incumbent)	169,924	68.9	−11.09%
Democratic	Lainey Melnick	65,834	27.9	+3.39%
Libertarian	James Arthur Strohm	7,687	3.3	−16.7%
Majority		96929		
Turnout		236,284		
Republican hold		Swing		

=== 2012 ===
Incumbent Lamar Smith faced five challengers in the 2012 general election on November 6, 2012: Candace Duval (Dem), John-Henry Liberty (Lib), Fidel Castillo (Grn), Bill Stout (Grn), and Carlos Pena (Ind).

2012 United States House of Representatives elections in Texas, District 21
Party	Candidate	Votes	%
Republican	Lamar Smith (Incumbent)	187,015	60.5
Democratic	Candace E. Duval	109,326	35.4
Libertarian	John-Henry Liberty	12,524	4.0
Total votes		308,865	100.0
Republican hold			

=== 2014 ===
2014 United States House of Representatives elections in Texas, District 21
Party	Candidate	Votes	%
Republican	Lamar Smith (Incumbent)	135,513	71.8
Libertarian	Ryan Shields	25,483	13.5
Green	Antonio Diaz	27,782	14.7
Total votes		188,778	100.0
Republican hold			

=== 2016 ===
2016 United States House of Representatives elections in Texas, District 21
Party	Candidate	Votes	%
Republican	Lamar Smith (Incumbent)	202,523	57.0
Democratic	Tom Wakely	129,253	36.4
Libertarian	Mark Loewe	14,698	4.1
Green	Tony Diaz	8,520	2.4
Total votes		354,994	100.0
Republican hold			

=== 2018 ===
Lamar Smith did not run for reelection in 2018.

On the Republican side, 18 candidates competed in the March 6 primary, in which no one received a majority. The first- and second-place finishers were, respectively, attorney Chip Roy, who served as chief of staff to Sen. Ted Cruz (R-Tex.) and senior advisor to Texas Gov. Rick Perry (R), and Matt McCall, owner of a business providing human tissue for American military hospitals. Roy and McCall advanced to a May 22 runoff, which Roy won with 52.7% of the vote.

On the Democratic side, four candidates ran to replace Smith: Joseph Kopser, entrepreneur and Army veteran; Derrick Crowe, activist; Elliott McFadden, executive director of Austin B-cycle; and Mary Street Wilson, pastor. No one received a majority in the March 6 primary, so the top two finishers, Wilson and Kopser, advanced to a runoff on May 22. Kopser flipped the primary result in the runoff against Wilson, winning the nomination with 58% of the vote.

2018 United States House of Representatives elections in Texas, District 21
Party	Candidate	Votes	%
Republican	Chip Roy	176,913	50.3
Democratic	Joseph Kopser	167,020	47.5
Libertarian	Lee Santos	7,497	2.1
Total votes		351,430	100.0
Republican hold			

=== 2020 ===
The incumbent, Chip Roy, was unopposed for the Republican nomination. Former state Senator Wendy Davis won the Democratic primary runoff. Tom Wakely was nominated by the Green Party caucus. The state Supreme Court allowed his inclusion after Wendy Davis tried unsuccessfully to have him removed from the ballot. Perennial candidate Arthur DiBianca was the Libertarian nominee; a last-minute lawsuit by Republicans to block DiBianca and 43 other Libertarian Party candidates from the ballot failed.

==== Primary results ====
Democratic primary results
Party	Candidate	Votes	%
Democratic	Wendy Davis	84,593	86.3
Democratic	Jennie Lou Leeder	13,485	13.7
Total votes		98,078	100.0

==== General election ====
Texas's 21st congressional district, 2020
Party	Candidate	Votes	%
Republican	Chip Roy (incumbent)	235,740	52.0
Democratic	Wendy Davis	205,780	45.3
Libertarian	Arthur DiBlanca	8,666	1.9
Green	Tom Wakely	3,564	0.8
Total votes		453,750	100.0
Republican hold			

=== 2022 ===
2022 United States House of Representatives elections in Texas, District 21
Party	Candidate	Votes	%
Republican	Chip Roy (incumbent)	207,426	62.8
Democratic	Claudia Zapata	122,655	37.1
Total votes		330,081	100.0
Republican hold			

=== 2024 ===
The incumbent, Chip Roy (R, Dripping Springs), an attorney, ran unopposed and was nominated in the March 5, 2024 Republican primary. Dr. Kristin Hook (D, San Antonio), a biologist formerly employed as a biologist by US Government Accountability Office, ran unopposed and was nominated in the March 5, 2024 Democratic primary. Bob King (L, New Braunfels), a retired energy finance executive and nonprofit leader, ran unopposed and was nominated at the Libertarian district convention on March 23, 2024.

2024 United States House of Representatives elections in Texas, District 21
Party	Candidate	Votes	%
Republican	Chip Roy (incumbent)	263,002	61.9
Democratic	Kristin Hook	152,900	36.0
Libertarian	Bob King	8,861	2.1
Total votes		424,763	100.0
Republican hold			

== Historical district boundaries ==
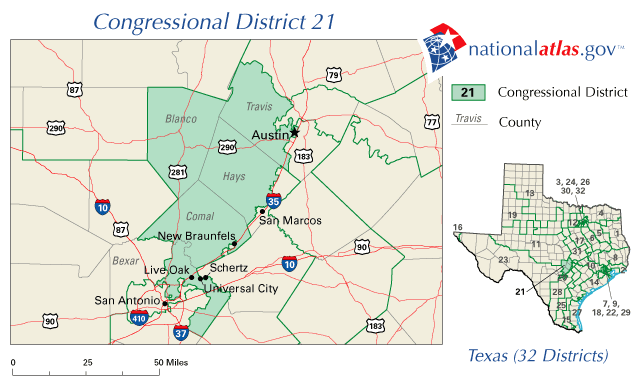
2005–2007

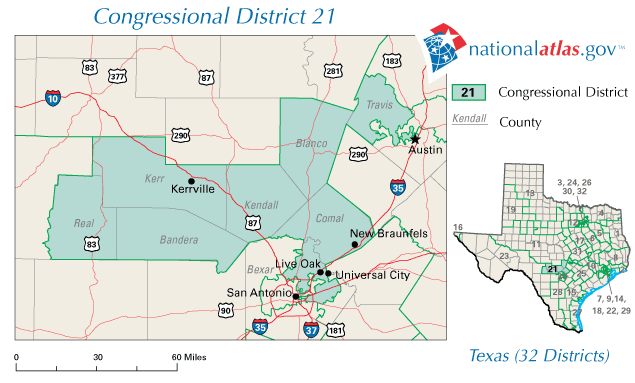
2007–2013

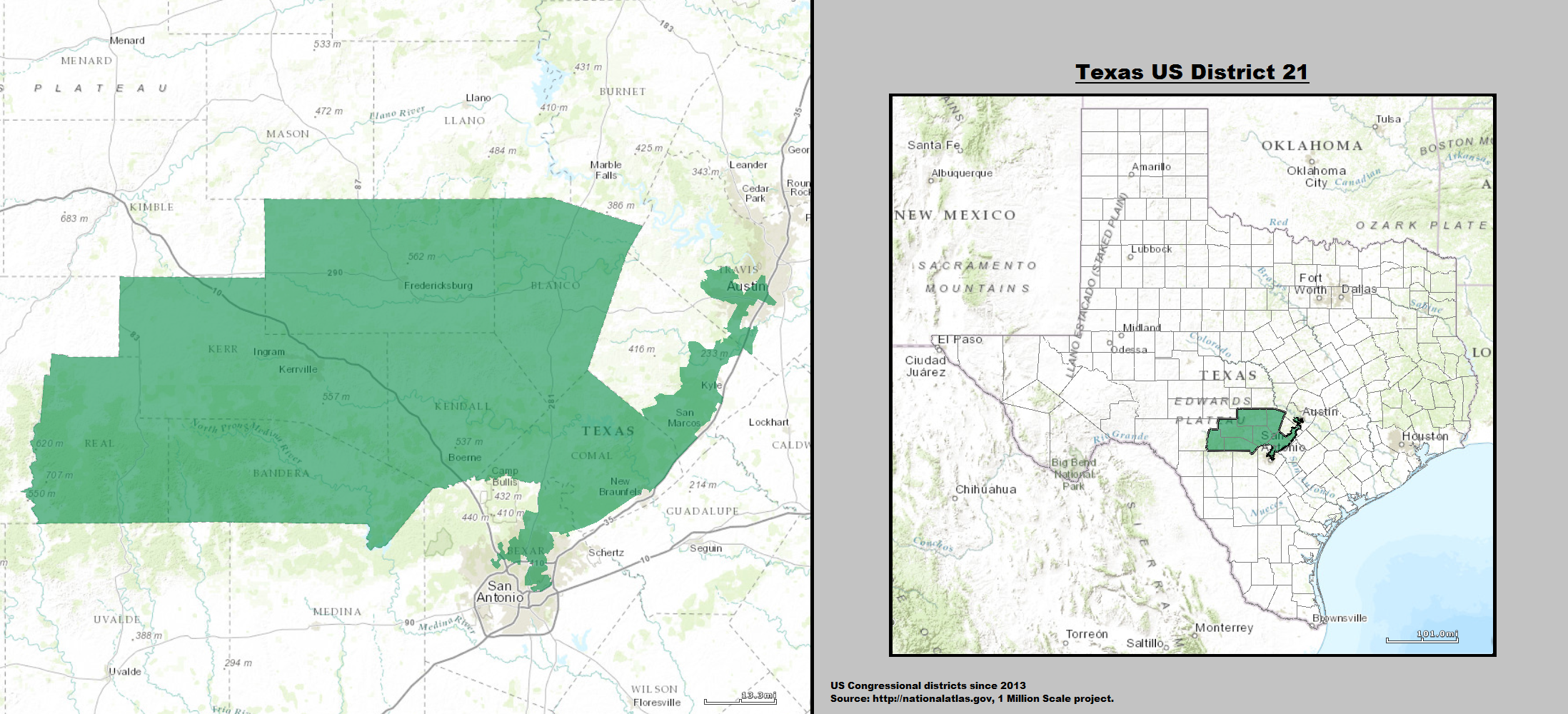
2013–2023

== See also ==
- List of United States congressional districts
- Texas's congressional delegations
