= Texas's 45th House of Representatives district =

American legislative district

Texas's 45th State House of Representatives district
Representative
Erin Zwiener; D–Driftwood
- Demographics: 44.8% White; 6.2% Black; 43.3% Hispanic; 4.7% Asian
- Population (2020) • Voting age: 201,407; 154,436

The 45th district of the Texas House of Representatives contains most of Hays county. The current representative is Erin Zwiener, who was first elected in 2018.

== Representatives ==
Member	Party	Term
Patrick Rose (San Marcos)	Democratic	2003–2011
Jason Isaac (Dripping Springs)	Republican	2011–2019
Erin Zwiener (Driftwood)	Democratic	2019–present

== Election results ==
=== Elections in the 2020s ===
Texas House of Representatives 45th district, 2022
Party	Candidate	Votes	%
Democratic	Erin Zwiener (incumbent)	39,078	59.2
Republican	Michelle Lopez	26,888	40.8
Majority		12,190	18.4
Total votes		65,966	100.0
Democratic hold			

Texas House of Representatives 45th district, 2020
Party	Candidate	Votes	%
Democratic	Erin Zwiener (incumbent)	57,383	50.5
Republican	Carrie Isaac	56,175	49.5
Majority		1,208	1.0
Total votes		113,558	100.0
Democratic hold			

=== Elections in the 2010s ===
Texas House of Representatives 45th district, 2018
Party	Candidate	Votes	%
Democratic	Erin Zwiener (incumbent)	43,207	51.6
Republican	Ken Strange	40,531	48.4
Majority		2,676	3.2
Total votes		83,738	100.0
Democratic gain from Republican			

Texas House of Representatives 45th district, 2016
Party	Candidate	Votes	%
Republican	Jason Isaac	47,937	100.0
Total votes		47,937	100.0
Republican hold			

Texas House of Representatives 45th district, 2014
Party	Candidate	Votes	%
Republican	Jason Isaac	25,739	72.6
Libertarian	Jim Duke	9,696	27.4
Total votes		35,435	100.0
Republican hold			

Texas House of Representatives 45th district, 2012
Party	Candidate	Votes	%
Republican	Jason Isaac	33,604	53.6
Democratic	John Adams	26,557	42.4
Libertarian	Jim Duke	2,495	4.0
Total votes		62,656	100.0
Republican hold			

Texas House of Representatives 45th district, 2010
Party	Candidate	Votes	%
Republican	Jason Isaac	27,715	53.9
Democratic	Patrick Rose	23,691	46.1
Total votes		51,406	100.0
Republican gain from Democratic			
