= Carrie Isaac =

American politician

Member of the Texas House of Representatives from the 73rd district
- Incumbent
- Assumed office January 10, 2023
- Preceded by: Kyle Biedermann

Personal details
- Born: Carrie Crain
- Party: Republican
- Spouse: Jason Isaac
- Children: 2
- Education: Stephen F. Austin State University (BS) Purdue Global (MS)
- Website: Campaign website

Carrie Isaac is an American politician serving as the Texas State Representative for District 73 since 2023. She is a member of the Republican Party.

== Career ==
Since 2017, Isaac has been the executive director of the Digital Education & Work Initiative of Texas, a nonprofit organization.

== Texas House of Representatives ==
=== Elections ===
==== 2020 ====
Isaac was the Republican nominee for District 45 in the 2020 election but lost to incumbent Democrat Erin Zwiener.

==== 2022 ====
Isaac was elected as the state representative for District 73 in the 2022 election to succeed retiring Representative Kyle Biedermann.

=== Caucus memberships ===
- Texas Freedom Caucus

== Political positions ==
=== Abortion ===
Isaac is anti-abortion.

=== Education ===
Isaac is a supporter of charter schools and opposes uncensored education, labeling it as critical race theory.

=== Voting rights ===
Isaac proposed to eliminate all polling places on college campuses. She cited safety concerns and political violence. She has made several posts in support of other forms of voting restrictions as well.

== Personal life ==
Isaac resides in Dripping Spring, Texas. She and her husband, Jason, have two children.

== Electoral history ==
Texas House of Representatives 73rd district, 2022
Party	Candidate	Votes	%
Republican	Carrie Isaac	67,491	70.4
Democratic	Justin Calhoun	28,441	29.7
Majority		39,050	40.7
Turnout		95,932	60.5
Republican hold			

2022 Texas House of Representatives election in District 73rd Republican primary runoff
Party	Candidate	Votes	%
Republican	Carrie Isaac	11,239	50.6
Republican	Barron Casteel	10,968	49.4

Texas House of Representatives 45th district, 2020
Party	Candidate	Votes	%
Democratic	Erin Zwiener	57,383	50.5
Republican	Carrie Isaac	56,175	49.5
Majority		1,208	1.0
Turnout		113,558	69.9
Democratic hold			
