= Texas's 73rd House of Representatives district =

American legislative district

Texas's 73rd State House of Representatives district
Representative
Carrie Isaac; R–Dripping Springs

District 73 is a district in the Texas House of Representatives. It has been represented by Republican Carrie Isaac since 2023.

== Geography ==
The district covers the counties of Comal and Hays.

== Members ==
- Nathan Macias (until 2009)
- Doug Miller (2009–2017)
- Kyle Biedermann (2017–2023)
- Carrie Isaac (since 2023)
