= Jason Isaac =

American politician (born 1971)

Member of the Texas House of Representatives from the 45th district
- In office January 11, 2011 – January 8, 2019
- Preceded by: Patrick Rose
- Succeeded by: Erin Zwiener

Personal details
- Born: Jason Alexander Isaac; December 25, 1971 (age 54) Houston, Texas, U.S.
- Party: Republican
- Spouse: Carrie Isaac
- Children: 2
- Education: Stephen F. Austin State University
- Occupation: Transportation consultant

Jason Alexander Isaac (born December 25, 1971) is an American politician who served as a Republican member of the Texas House of Representatives.

== Political career ==
=== Texas House of Representatives ===
==== Elections ====
===== 2010 =====
Isaac was unopposed in the Republican primary and defeated incumbent Democrat Patrick Rose 54% to 46% in the general election.

===== 2012 =====
After redistricting Isaac won re-election in his redrawn seat 54% to 42% over Democrat John Adams.

=== United States House of Representatives ===
==== Elections ====
===== 2018 =====
Following the retirement of long time incumbent Lamar Smith, Isaac was one of 18 candidates who were on the ballot to replace him. In the March 6 primary he finished fourth, failing to make the run off.

== Political positions ==
=== Abortion ===
An anti-abortion legislator, Isaac supported a 2013 ban on abortion after twenty weeks of gestation that passed the House, 96–49. He also co-sponsored companion legislation to increase medical and licensing requirements of abortion providers, a move which opponents said could lead to closure of many such clinics. During his congressional campaign he stated that abortion should not be legal at any stage.

== Electoral history ==
Republican primary for Texas's 21st congressional district, 2018
Party	Candidate	Votes	%
Republican	Chip Roy	19,319	27.1
Republican	Matt McCall	12,088	16.9
Republican	William Negley	11,088	15.5
Republican	Jason Isaac	7,165	10.0
Republican	Jenifer Sarver	4,001	5.6
Republican	Robert Stovall	3,396	4.7
Republican	Susan Narvaiz	2,710	3.8
Republican	Francisco Canseco	2,484	3.5
Republican	Ryan Krause	2,289	3.2
Republican	Al M. Poteet	1,292	1.8
Republican	Peggy Wardlaw	1,281	1.8
Republican	Samuel Temple	1,017	1.4
Republican	Anthony J. White	949	1.3
Republican	Eric Burkhart	719	1.0
Republican	Mauro Garza	657	0.9
Republican	Autry J. Pruitt	454	0.6
Republican	Foster Hagen	392	0.5
Republican	Ivan A. Andarza	95	0.1
Total votes		71,396	100

Texas House of Representatives 45th district, 2016
Party	Candidate	Votes	%
Republican	Jason Isaac	47,937	100.0
Total votes		47,937	100.0
Republican hold			

Texas House of Representatives 45th district, 2014
Party	Candidate	Votes	%
Republican	Jason Isaac	25,739	72.6
Libertarian	Jim Duke	9,696	27.4
Total votes		35,435	100.0
Republican hold			

Texas House of Representatives 45th district, 2012
Party	Candidate	Votes	%
Republican	Jason Isaac	33,604	53.6
Democratic	John Adams	26,557	42.4
Libertarian	Jim Duke	2,495	4.0
Total votes		62,656	100.0
Republican hold			

Texas House of Representatives 45th district, 2010
Party	Candidate	Votes	%
Republican	Jason Isaac	27,715	53.9
Democratic	Patrick Rose	23,691	46.1
Total votes		51,406	100.0
Republican gain from Democratic			

== Personal life ==
Jason married Carrie Crain two years after she graduated. They have two sons, Aidan Isaac (born 2002) and Landon Isaac (born 2004).

Texas House of Representatives
Preceded by Patrick Rose	Member of the Texas House of Representatives from District 45 (Dripping Springs); 2011–2019	Succeeded by Erin Zwiener
