= Patrick Rose =

American politician

Member of the Texas House of Representatives from the 45th district
- In office January 14, 2003 – January 11, 2011
- Preceded by: Rick Green
- Succeeded by: Jason Isaac

Personal details
- Born: October 10, 1978 (age 47) Dripping Springs, Texas, U.S.
- Party: Democratic
- Spouse: Anna Carbajal
- Children: 2
- Education: Princeton University (A.B.); University of Texas at Austin (J.D.)
- Profession: Businessman

Patrick M. Rose (born October 10, 1978) is a former Texas Democratic politician, who from 2002 to 2010 served as a member of the Texas House of Representatives from House District 45, which then consisted of Blanco, Caldwell, and Hays counties in Central Texas.

== Early life and education ==
Rose was born and grew up in Dripping Springs, Texas. He graduated with High Honors in 2001 with an A.B. in Public Policy from the Woodrow Wilson School of Public and International Affairs at Princeton University; his senior thesis was titled "The Realities of School Reform: Educational Leadership Patterns in Trenton's Public Schools". He then earned a J.D. from the University of Texas School of Law, and practiced law with the Ratliff firm in Austin before opening his own law firm in San Marcos.

== Political career ==
=== Texas House of Representatives ===
In November 2002, after campaigning while still in law school, Rose defeated the Republican incumbent, Rick Green, to win election to the Texas House of Representatives from District 45; his margin of victory was less than 1 percent of all votes cast. Paul Stekler's 2004 PBS film Last Man Standing: Politics Texas Style for the POV series chronicles Rose's campaign and contrasts it with that year's Texas governor's race. At the time of his election, Rose was the youngest member of the Texas House at 24.

In his freshman term, Rose supported the tort reform bill pursued by Governor Rick Perry and other Republicans, putting forward an amendment requiring a reduction in the price of malpractice insurance for physicians, but also participated in the Democratic withdrawal to Ardmore, Oklahoma to prevent legislative approval of the Republicans' plan for 2003 Texas redistricting. After his freshman Session, Rose received the distinguished "Rookie of the Year" designation from Texas Monthly Magazine.

Rose was re-elected for three further terms, in 2004, 2006, and 2008. He was named to the chairmanship of the House Human Services Committee for the 2007-2008 biennium after supporting Republican Tom Craddick for election to a third term as Speaker, and was reappointed as chair of the Human Services Committee for the 2009-2010 session by Speaker Joe Straus.

In 2010, he was defeated for re-election by Republican Jason Isaac.

==== Elections ====
===== 2002 =====
In 2002, Rose defeated incumbent Republican State Representative Rick Green, by a margin of 48.81% to 47.93%, with 3.24% going to Green Party candidate John D. Schmidt.

===== 2004 =====
In 2004, Rose defeated Republican challenger Alan Askew by a much more comfortable margin of 54.56% to 45.43%.

===== 2006 =====
In 2006, Rose defeated Republican challenger Jim Neuhaus by a large margin of 60.12% to 35.83% with 4.04% going to Libertarian candidate Tom Gleinser.

===== 2008 =====
In 2008, Rose defeated Republican challenger Matt Young by a large margin of 59.30% to 37.43% with 3.25% going to Libertarian Tom Gleinser.

===== 2010 =====
In 2010, Rose was defeated by Republican challenger Jason Isaac by a total of 46.09% to 53.90%.

== Later career ==
Rose founded Corridor Title in October 2010. Dedicating himself full-time to Corridor Title's success, the company has grown into the Austin-San Antonio Region, with over 90 employees and offices currently located in Austin, Dripping Springs, Georgetown, Lockhart, New Braunfels, Houston and San Marcos.

== Personal life ==
Rose is married to Anna Carbajal, and they have two sons, Henry and Charlie. They reside in San Marcos, where they are members of Our Lady of Wisdom University Parish.

Texas House of Representatives
Preceded by Rick Green	Member of the Texas House of Representatives from District 45 (Dripping Springs); 2003–2011	Succeeded by Jason Isaac
