= Dripping Springs High School =

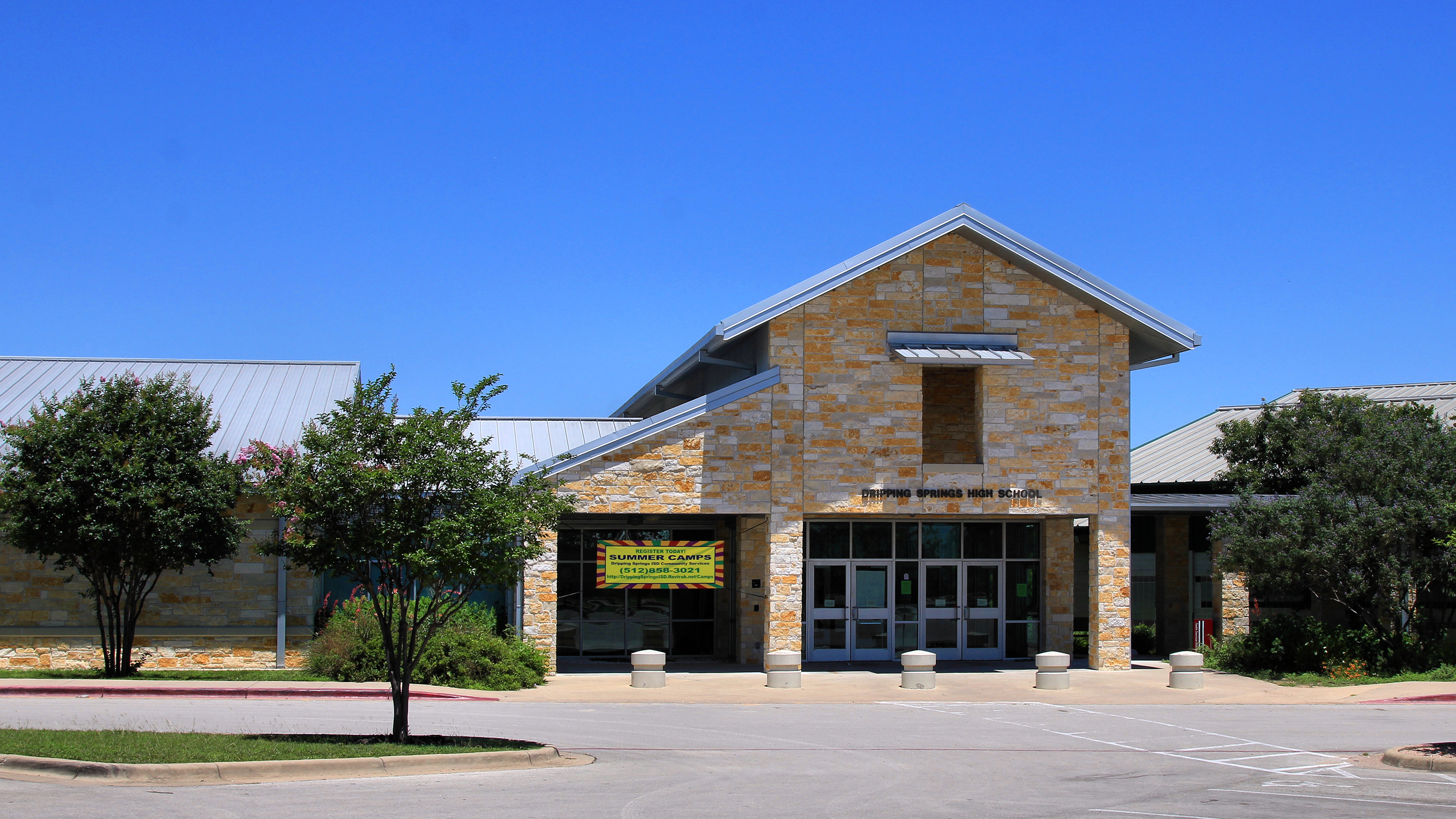
- Dripping Springs High School

Location
- 940 Highway 290 West; Dripping Springs, Texas 78620; United States; 30.196927°N 98.100970°W

Information
- Type: Comprehensive Public High School
- Established: 1911
- Principal: Angela Gamez
- Teaching staff: 152.46 (on an FTE basis)
- Grades: 9–12
- Enrollment: 2,622 (2025-2026)
- Student to teacher ratio: 16.29
- Athletics conference: UIL Class 6A
- Team name: Tigers
- Website: www.dsisdtx.us/o/dshs

Dripping Springs High School is a public high school in Dripping Springs, Texas, located in Hays County, Texas. The only high school in the Dripping Springs Independent School District, it contains grades 9, 10, 11, and 12. Its enrollment is approximately 2,400. The principal is Angela Gamez, who was appointed in 2019.

== History ==
Public school in Dripping Springs extended only through seventh grade until the 1911–12 school year, when the county designated it a "high school of the third class," offering three years of high school; the twelfth grade was added in 1941–42. The first high school building was completed by 1938. After the school district was formed by the consolidation of several small districts and achieved accreditation, a new building begun in 1949 replaced it; then-Senator Lyndon Johnson spoke at the dedication of the gymnasium, which was finished in 1952. The school moved to a new building in 1985 and moved again in an exchange of sites with the junior high school in 2010. In the 21st century it has been expanding as population grows in the area of Austin.

== Academics ==
DSHS has a 99% graduation rate, with approximately 93% of graduates attending either a two-year or four-year post-secondary institution. It was the first school in Texas to institute a requirement for a senior portfolio, to be submitted to a panel including a teacher, a member of the community, and a person in the student's intended field of work.

Drippings Springs High School has received much recognition in recent years, including the 2012 "College Readiness Award" from the Texas ACT Council for maintaining or increasing the number of students taking the ACT Assessment over the past five years and significantly increasing their level of achievement and college readiness. It has been recognized as one of the top high schools in Central Texas by the organization Children at Risk for the past several years, ranking seventh in the spring of 2015. In the Daily Beast's poll released in August 2014, it was ranked 83rd in the country and eighth in the state of Texas. U.S. News & World Report recognized it as one of the top high schools in the country in spring 2015: DSHS earned the designation of "Silver Medal" in 2016, and currently [when?] is ranked 113th in the state of Texas and #1014 on the national list. In the 2015 Newsweek list of "America's Top High Schools," Dripping Springs High School was ranked 30th in Texas and 480th in the nation.

== Sports ==
Dripping Springs' teams are the Tigers. The school has historically competed in baseball (since the 19th century, before it became a separate high school), boys' and girls' basketball (since the early 20th century), the Girls basketball team won a state title in 1994, boys' and girls' cross-country (since 1971), football (beginning with six-man football in 1938), boys' and girls' golf (since 1953 and 1974), powerlifting (since 1992), boys' and girls' soccer (since 1979 and 1999), girls' softball (since 1994), boys' and girls' swimming (since 2000), tennis (since 1940, and team tennis since the mid-1990s), boys' and girls' track (at least since the early 1920s), girls' volleyball (since the 1940s or earlier), and wrestling (since 2009). The volleyball team won state in 2016. The Swim Team won the State Championship in 2018. The girls' varsity soccer team won the 5A State Championship in 2021 against Frisco Wakeland.

== Marching Band ==
The Dripping Springs Tiger Band is a consistent UIL finalist and frequently competes in the Bands of America circuit. The Tiger band was the UIL conference AAAA state champion in 2009 and the 2011 state silver medalists. In 2015, the Tiger band returned to compete in state finals, earning sixth in UIL conference AAAAA. In 2017, the band earned second place in state finals. The Tiger Band was the BOA McAllen regional champion in 2017, and most recently made sixth at the BOA St. Louis Super Regional competition in 2018. The band placed tenth in the 2019 state finals competition. In 2023, the Tiger band was the BOA Waco regional champion, and was a semi-finalist at the BOA Grand National Championships.

The Tiger band also competes in the TCGC and WGI circuits for both winter guard and winter percussion. Recently, the winter percussion ensembles placed first in 2014, and fourth in 2017 in TCGC state finals in the Scholastic A division. In 2015, the percussion ensemble earned second place in the Scholastic Open division during TCGC finals and seventh in 2016 in the same division. The winter percussion group was named the TCGC Scholastic A silver medalists in 2019.

In TCGC Division Scholastic National A, the varsity winter guard earned silver in 2018, and bronze in 2017. In 2016, they were the Scholastic A champions. In 2016, the winter guard earned 10th in Scholastic A finals at the WGI Championships competition in Dayton, Ohio. In 2019, the winter guard was named the TCGC Scholastic Open Champions. In 2019 they were named the WGI World Championship Scholastic Open bronze medalists.

In 2025, they became UIL 6A state finalists, BOA Super Regional Finalists, and BOA Grand National Finalists. This is the first time in their school’s history to do that, earning themselves 11th in state, 12th in Super Regionals, and 9th in Grand Nationals.

== Notable alumni ==
- Austin Novosad (2023), college football quarterback for the Bowling Green Falcons
- Brett Banks (2022), 4th place speaker World Schools Debate Nationals
- Ty Myers (2025), Country and Contemporary Artist
