= HYI =

HYI may refer to:

- Harvard–Yenching Institute
- Hydrus, a constellation of the southern sky
- San Marcos Municipal Airport, in Texas, United States
