= Erin Zwiener =

American author and politician

Member of the Texas House of Representatives from the 45th district
- Incumbent
- Assumed office January 8, 2019
- Preceded by: Jason Isaac

Personal details
- Born: September 22, 1985 (age 40)
- Party: Democratic
- Education: University of Montana; University of Arizona (MFA)
- Website: Campaign website

Erin Alisa Zwiener (born September 22, 1985) is an American author and politician who is a Democratic member of the Texas House of Representatives for District 45.

== Biography ==
Zwiener grew up in Texas and currently lives in Hays County, Texas. She graduated from the University of Montana with a bachelor's degree in forestry. She then attended the University of Arizona for graduate school, earning an M.F.A in Creative Writing. Zwiener lived in Abiquiú, New Mexico, and appeared on Jeopardy! four times in 2012, having won $53,399. Zwiener wrote a children's book. She moved to Driftwood, Texas, with her husband in 2016.

== Political career ==
After the 2016 United States elections, she became involved in the Indivisible movement, cofounding the chapter for Hays County, Texas.

=== Texas House of Representatives ===
When Zwiener questioned Republican Jason Isaac, who represented her district in the Texas House of Representatives, about his support for Texas Senate Bill 4, which effectively banned sanctuary cities in Texas, over Facebook, Isaac accused her of "trolling" and blocked her. She decided to run for his seat in the Texas House and declared her candidacy in March 2017 for the Texas House of Representatives elections, 2018 and received assistance from Run for Something. Zwiener was pregnant during the campaign and gave birth in summer of 2018. She finished in second place to Rebecca Bell-Metereau in the Democratic Party primary election, but advanced to a runoff election and won by less than 200 votes. Zwiener went into labor at an anti-Donald Trump protest, and continued to campaign from the hospital before and after giving birth. She won in the general election, receiving 51 percent of the vote, defeating Republican nominee Ken Strange, who polled 49 percent of the ballots cast. She succeeded Isaac in the state House; Isaac did not seek reelection to the House but ran unsuccessfully for his party's nomination in Texas's 21st congressional district.

Zwiener is bisexual and is one of the founding members of the first LGBTQ Caucus in the Texas Legislature. She is one of the authors of HB 517 which would ban conversion therapy in Texas.

Zwiener also founded the Texas Energy and Climate Caucus, a bipartisan coalition of 56 members defending renewable energy and bringing more innovative, low-carbon energy to Texas.

Texas House of Representatives
Preceded by Jason Isaac	Member of the Texas House of Representatives from District 45 (Driftwood); 2011–2019	Succeeded by Incumbent
