= Belterra, Texas =

- Census-designated place
- Location within Texas Location within the United States
- Coordinates: 30°11′19″N 97°59′04″W
- Country: United States
- State: Texas
- County: Hays
- Elevation: 1,096 ft (334 m)

Population (2020)
  - Total: 6,170
- Time zone: UTC-6 (Central (CST))
  - Summer (DST): UTC-5 (CDT)
- GNIS feature ID: 2805786

Belterra is an unincorporated community and census-designated place (CDP) in Hays County, Texas, United States, with a land mass of approximately 3.4 square miles. It is 18 miles (29 km) southwest of downtown Austin. Belterra, Texas had a population of 6,170 at the time of the 2020 census.

Belterra, Texas is bordered by Highway 290 on the north side, Mesa Verde Drive and Sand Hills Lane to the south, Sawyer Ranch Road to the west, and Nutty Brown Road to the east. Belterra is located in the Dripping Springs Independent School District. Belterra is located in the Extra Territorial Jurisdiction (ETJ) of the city of Dripping Springs, Texas.

== Demographics ==
Historical population
Census	Pop.	Note	%±
2020	6,170		—
U.S. Decennial Census; 1850–1900 1910; 1920 1930 1940; 1950 1960 1970; 1980 1990 2000; 2010 2020

Belterra first appeared as a census designated place in the 2020 U.S. census.

=== 2020 Census ===
Belterra CDP, Texas – Racial and ethnic composition Note: the US Census treats Hispanic/Latino as an ethnic category. This table excludes Latinos from the racial categories and assigns them to a separate category. Hispanics/Latinos may be of any race.
Race / Ethnicity (NH = Non-Hispanic)	Pop 2020	% 2020
White alone (NH)	4,651	75.38%
Black or African American alone (NH)	73	1.18%
Native American or Alaska Native alone (NH)	17	0.28%
Asian alone (NH)	255	4.13%
Native Hawaiian or Pacific Islander alone (NH)	3	0.05%
Other race alone (NH)	16	0.26%
Mixed race or Multiracial (NH)	286	4.64%
Hispanic or Latino (any race)	869	14.08%
Total	6,170	100.00%
