= Kyle Biedermann =

American politician (born 1959)

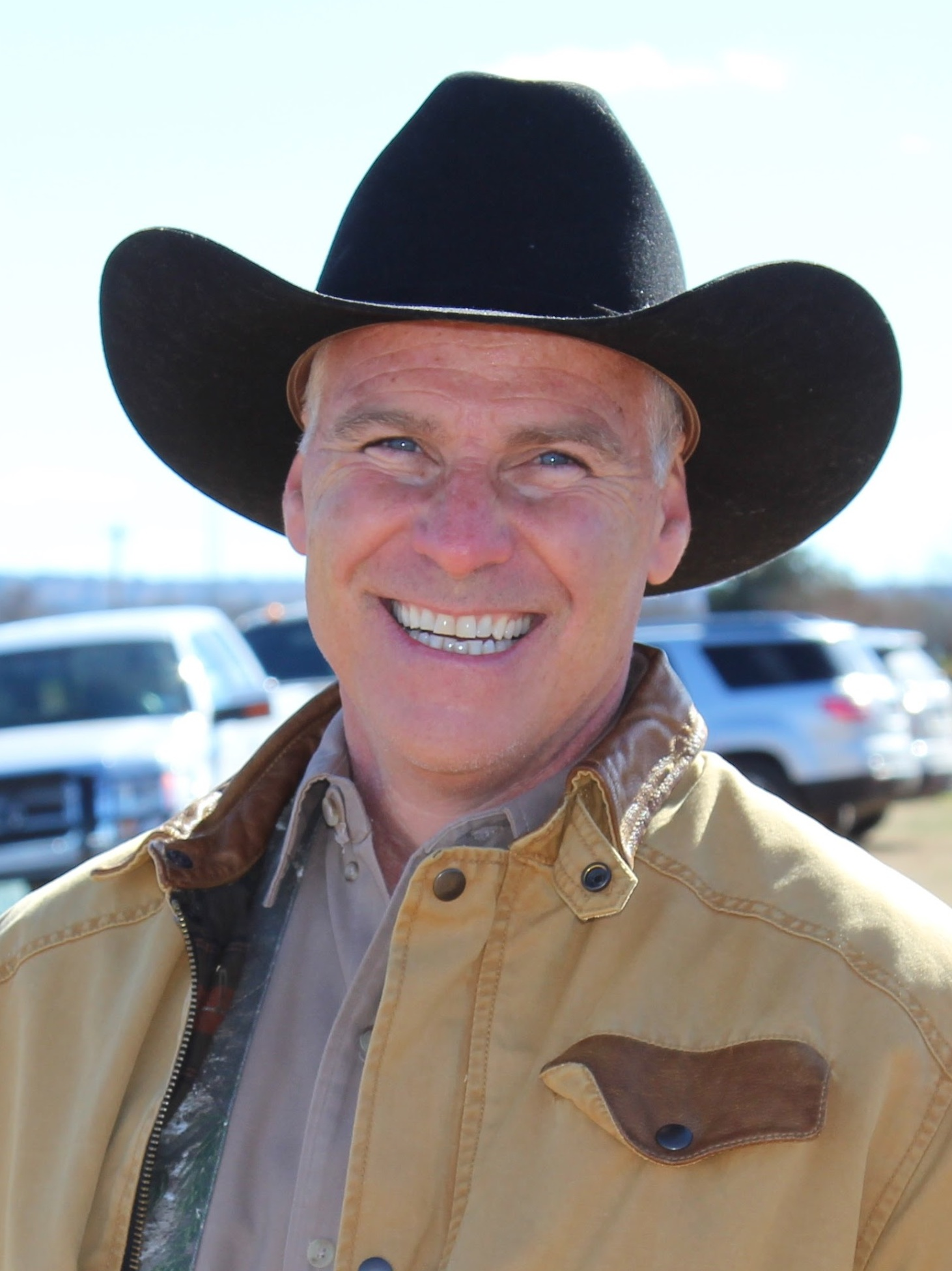

Member of the Texas House of Representatives from the 73rd district
- In office January 10, 2017 – January 10, 2023
- Preceded by: Doug Miller
- Succeeded by: Carrie Isaac

Personal details
- Born: Kenneth Kyle Biedermann; April 30, 1959 (age 67)
- Party: Republican
- Occupation: Businessman, Owner, Biedermann Ace Hardware, Fredericksburg, Texas

Kenneth Kyle Biedermann, known as Kyle Biedermann (born April 30, 1959), is an American politician who served as a member of the Texas House of Representatives for District 73 from 2017 to 2023. Biedermann owns and operates a hardware store within the district.

Biedermann defeated incumbent Doug Miller, chairman of the Special Purpose District Committee, on May 24, 2016, in the Republican primary runoff election. Biedermann polled 10,481 votes (55.4 percent) to Miller's 8,438 (44.6 percent). Biedermann faced no Democratic opponent in the November 2016 general election.

Biedermann won his second House term in the general election held on November 6, 2018. With 69,006 votes (74.8 percent), he defeated Democrat Stephanie Phillips, who polled 23,237 votes (25.2 percent).

== Legislative voting record and positions ==
=== Immigration ===
Biedermann supported SB 1252, otherwise known as the Interstate Compact for Border Security, which would have given the State of Texas the power to enforce the State's own border protection laws. In addition, he voted in favor of the Schaefer Amendment of SB 4 which banned Sanctuary Cities and fully funded an increase in border security funding. Biedermann also voted to end benefits for illegal immigrants as well as penalizing employers who do not use E-Verify and allow law enforcement to check the legal status of detained individuals.

=== Abortion ===
Biedermann describes himself as pro-life, voting on numerous pieces of legislation to restrict or prohibit the practice of abortion in the state of Texas. He voted in favor of Amendment 76 (Krause Amend.) of SB1 which increased funding for the Alternatives to Abortion Program by $20,000,000. He also voted on the 2nd and 22nd Amendment of SB 8 which would have banned a procedure known as "dismemberment abortions" and the abolishment of late term abortions for children with disabilities (respectively).

=== Property Tax Reform ===
A strong supporter of property tax reform, Biedermann has voted on multiple pieces of legislation regarding the reformation of current property tax plans in the state of Texas. He voted against HB 486, a bill that would have made it easier for school districts to raise property taxes without first getting voter approval. He voted against SB 1 RV No. 164, a motion that killed 3 amendments that would have expanded property tax reform. Additionally, he voted in favor of HB 208 RV No. 155, a bill designed to cap growth in state spending at the rise of population plus inflation.

=== Secession ===
Biedermann is in favor of the secession of Texas from the Union. In late 2020, he said he was committed to submitting a bill to the legislature to begin the process. On January 26, 2021, Biedermann filed the Texas Independence Referendum Act (HB 1359), a bill to allow for a state referendum on secession.

== Legislative Ratings ==
Biedermann Legislative Rankings by Policy Groups
Year	Empower Texans	Young Conservatives of Texas	Texas State Rifle Association	Texas Right to Life
2017	96 (A+)	89 (B+)	100 (A+)	100 (A+)

== U.S. Capitol attack ==
Biedermann attended the storming of the United States Capitol on January 6, 2021. He refused to release emails from his official government account from the dates surrounding his trip to Washington, D.C. despite the email being in the public record per the Texas Public Information Act.

== Criticism ==
During the primary campaign, a photo surfaced of Biedermann dressed up as Gay Hitler, a recurring Saturday Night Live character portrayed by Chris Kattan, for a charity event in 2008. He was criticized by the Anti-Defamation League.

In January 2017, Biedermann sent a survey to Muslim leaders asking them questions about their interpretations of Islam in preparation for a "Homeland Security Summit". The surveys were distributed as part of a campaign designed to expose "radical Islamic terrorism in Texas", and preceded a forum Mr. Biedermann held at the State Capitol, scheduled to coincide with Texas Muslim Capitol Day, an educational event. The episode attracted critical media coverage and condemnation by civil rights advocates.

Texas House of Representatives
Preceded by Doug Miller	Texas State Representative for District 73 (Comal, Gillespie, and Kendall counties); 2017–2023	Succeeded by Carrie Isaac
