= Doug Miller (Texas politician) =

American politician (born 1954)

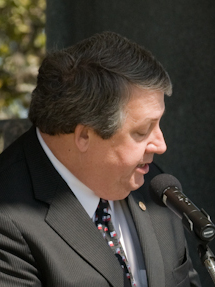
- Miller in 2011

Member of the Texas House of Representatives from the 73rd district
- In office 2009–2017
- Preceded by: Nathan Macias
- Succeeded by: Kyle Biedermann

Personal details
- Born: July 14, 1954 (age 72) New Braunfels, Texas, U.S.
- Party: Republican
- Spouse: Anne Miller
- Children: 2
- Education: Texas State University

Doug Miller (born July 14, 1954) is an American politician. He served as a Republican member for the 73rd district of the Texas House of Representatives.

Miller was born in New Braunfels, Texas. He attended Texas State University, where he earned a Bachelor of Science degree in law enforcement in 1976. He served as the mayor of New Braunfels. In 2009, Miller was elected for the 73rd district of the Texas House of Representatives, succeeding Nathan Macias. In 2017 he was succeeded by Kyle Biedermann. In 2022 he ran for membership of the Eagle Mountain-Saginaw Independent School District, but was not elected.
