= Dripping Springs Independent School District =

Public school district in Texas

Address
- 300 Sportsplex Drive Dripping Springs, Texas, 78620; United States

District information
- Grades: PK–12
- Schools: 8
- NCES District ID: 4800008

Students and staff
- Students: 8,538
- Teachers: 564.45 (on an FTE basis)
- Student–teacher ratio: 15.13:1

Other information
- Website: www.dsisdtx.us

Dripping Springs Independent School District is a public school district based in the northwest portion of Hays County, Texas, United States, serving approximately 8,000 students.

In addition to Dripping Springs, the district serves Driftwood and the village of Bear Creek and rural areas in northwestern Hays County. A small portion of southwestern Travis County also lies within the district.

== History ==
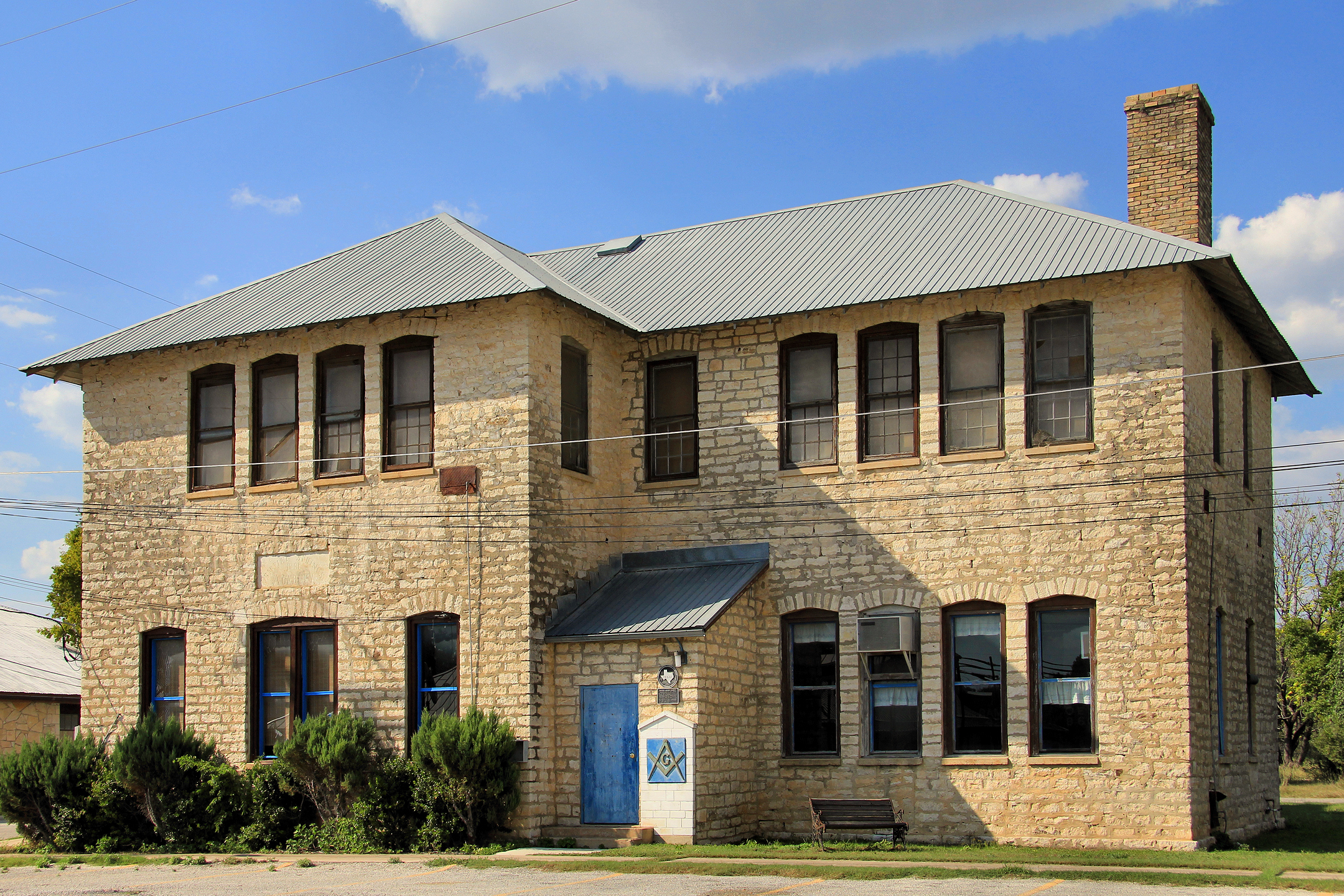
Dripping Springs Academy building, constructed as a private church-affiliated school and then used as a public school until 1949

Formal public education in Dripping Springs began in 1876. After being superseded during the 1880s by a private Baptist boarding school, it was reestablished in 1890 with the school continuing to be operated by the Baptist Church. In 1921 the Baptists deeded the school to the state. In 1940 citizens voted to consolidate the Dripping Springs Public School System with 14 other small districts in the area, including the Lake Travis district, after which the district became accredited for the first time and a program of building new schools began in 1949. In 1981, Lake Travis Independent School District split from Dripping Springs, with the boundary approximately following the county line.

In August 2017, two new schools were opened – a second middle school and a fourth elementary school. These schools, Sycamore Springs Middle School and Sycamore Springs Elementary, are connected but function separately. A bond approved by voters in May 2018 increased the capacity of Dripping Springs High School to 2,500 students and added a fifth elementary school, Cypress Springs Elementary, which opened in August 2021.

== Schools ==
=== High schools ===
- Dripping Springs High School (Grades 9–12)

Dripping Springs High School is a comprehensive public high school consisting of grades 9, 10, 11, and 12. The enrollment is approximately 2,300 students.

=== Middle schools ===
- Dripping Springs Middle School (Grades 6–8)
  - 2001–02 National Blue Ribbon School
- Sycamore Springs Middle School (Grades 6–8)

=== Elementary schools ===
- Cypress Springs Elementary (PK-Grade 5)
- Dripping Springs Elementary (PK-Grade 5)
- Rooster Springs Elementary (PK-Grade 5)
- Sycamore Springs Elementary (PK-Grade 5)
- Walnut Springs Elementary (PK-Grade 5)
- Wildwood Springs Elementary(PK-Grade 5)

== Notable alumni ==
- Wallis Currie-Wood, actress
