= Goforth, Texas =

- Unincorporated community
- Location within Texas Location within the United States
- Coordinates: 30°01′19″N 97°47′36″W
- Country: United States
- State: Texas
- County: Hays
- Elevation: 620 ft (190 m)
- Time zone: UTC-6 (Central (CST))
  - Summer (DST): UTC-5 (CDT)
- GNIS feature ID: 1378364

Goforth is a ghost town in Hays County, Texas, United States.

== History ==
The community was named for businessman J. T. Goforth, who owned land and was a merchant. Cotton was the main business. From 1890 to 1902, there was a post office. There was a school, which closed in 1948.
