= Bear Creek, Texas =

- Village
- Interactive map of Bear Creek, Texas
- Coordinates: 30°11′21″N 97°56′41″W
- Country: United States
- State: Texas
- County: Hays

Area
  - Total: 1.14 sq mi (2.96 km^{2})
  - Land: 1.14 sq mi (2.96 km^{2})
  - Water: 0 sq mi (0.00 km^{2})
- Elevation: 991 ft (302 m)

Population (2020)
  - Total: 397
  - Density: 347.9/sq mi (134.34/km^{2})
- Time zone: UTC-6 (Central (CST))
  - Summer (DST): UTC-5 (CDT)
- FIPS code: 48-06242
- GNIS feature ID: 1802731
- Website: vilbc.org

Bear Creek is a village in Hays County, Texas, United States. The population was 397 at the 2020 census.

== History ==
The village was established in November 1997.

== Geography ==
Bear Creek is located in northern Hays County. It is bordered to the north and east by the city of Austin and is 16 miles (26 km) by road southwest of downtown. The northern border of Bear Creek is the Travis County line, and the eastern border follows Ranch to Market Road 1826.

According to the United States Census Bureau, the village has a total area of 1.2 square miles (3.0 km^{2}), all land. Bear Creek, the village's namesake, passes 0.3 miles (0.48 km) south of the village limits and is part of the Onion Creek watershed, flowing to the Colorado River.

== Demographics ==
Historical population
Census	Pop.	Note	%±
2000	360		—
2010	382		6.1%
2020	397		3.9%
U.S. Decennial Census

As of the census of 2000, there were 360 people, 118 households, and 98 families residing in the village. The population density was 312.6 inhabitants per square mile (120.7/km^{2}). There were 121 housing units at an average density of 105.1 per square mile (40.6/km^{2}). The racial makeup of the village was 96.11% White, 1.39% African American, 1.39% from other races, and 1.11% from two or more races. Hispanic or Latino of any race were 5.00% of the population.

There were 118 households, out of which 44.9% had children under the age of 18 living with them, 71.2% were married couples living together, 7.6% had a female householder with no husband present, and 16.9% were non-families. 8.5% of all households were made up of individuals, and 1.7% had someone living alone who was 65 years of age or older. The average household size was 3.05 and the average family size was 3.26.

In the village, the population was spread out, with 29.4% under the age of 18, 6.7% from 18 to 24, 31.1% from 25 to 44, 28.3% from 45 to 64, and 4.4% who were 65 years of age or older. The median age was 39 years. For every 100 females, there were 91.5 males. For every 100 females age 18 and over, there were 93.9 males.

The median income for a household in the village was $78,691, and the median income for a family was $90,255. Males had a median income of $56,250 versus $26,250 for females. The per capita income for the village was $33,059. About 2.6% of families and 2.3% of the population were below the poverty line, including 3.8% of those under age 18 and none of those age 65 or over.

== Education ==
The village of Bear Creek is served by the Dripping Springs Independent School District.

== See also ==
- List of villages in Texas
