= Hays, Texas =

- City
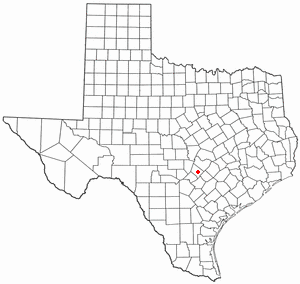
- Location of Hays, Texas

- Coordinates: 30°07′15″N 97°52′26″W
- Country: United States
- State: Texas
- County: Hays
- Incorporated: 1979

Area
  - Total: 0.22 sq mi (0.58 km^{2})
  - Land: 0.22 sq mi (0.58 km^{2})
  - Water: 0 sq mi (0.00 km^{2})
- Elevation: 728 ft (222 m)

Population (2020)
  - Total: 227
  - Density: 1,000/sq mi (390/km^{2})
- Time zone: UTC-6 (Central (CST))
  - Summer (DST): UTC-5 (CDT)
- FIPS code: 48-32906
- GNIS feature ID: 2410723
- Website: cityofhays.org

Hays is a city in Hays County, Texas, United States. The population was 227 at the 2020 census.

== Geography ==
Hays is located in northeastern Hays County 14 miles (23 km) southwest of downtown Austin.

According to the United States Census Bureau, the city has a total area of 0.22 square miles (0.58 km^{2}), all land.

== Demographics ==
Historical population
Census	Pop.	Note	%±
1980	286		—
1990	251		−12.2%
2000	233		−7.2%
2010	217		−6.9%
2020	227		4.6%
U.S. Decennial Census; 2020 Census

=== 2020 census ===
As of the 2020 census, Hays had a population of 227. The median age was 46.5 years; 20.7% of residents were under the age of 18 and 23.3% of residents were 65 years of age or older. For every 100 females there were 81.6 males, and for every 100 females age 18 and over there were 81.8 males age 18 and over.

There were 77 households in Hays, of which 14.3% had children under the age of 18 living in them. Of all households, 48.1% were married-couple households, 15.6% were households with a male householder and no spouse or partner present, and 29.9% were households with a female householder and no spouse or partner present. About 23.4% of all households were made up of individuals and 13.0% had someone living alone who was 65 years of age or older.

There were 92 housing units, of which 16.3% were vacant. The homeowner vacancy rate was 5.3% and the rental vacancy rate was 0.0%.

95.2% of residents lived in urban areas, while 4.8% lived in rural areas.

Racial composition as of the 2020 census
Race	Number	Percent
White	180	79.3%
Black or African American	6	2.6%
American Indian and Alaska Native	1	0.4%
Asian	3	1.3%
Native Hawaiian and Other Pacific Islander	0	0.0%
Some other race	6	2.6%
Two or more races	31	13.7%
Hispanic or Latino (of any race)	47	20.7%

=== 2000 census ===
As of the 2000 census, there were 233 people, 88 households, and 73 families residing in the city. The population density was 1,346.1 inhabitants per square mile (519.7/km^{2}). There were 88 housing units at an average density of 508.4 per square mile (196.3/km^{2}). The racial makeup of the city was 91.42% White, 1.72% African American, 0.43% Asian, 6.01% from other races, and 0.43% from two or more races. Hispanic or Latino of any race were 8.15% of the population.

There were 88 households, out of which 30.7% had children under the age of 18 living with them, 62.5% were married couples living together, 14.8% had a female householder with no husband present, and 17.0% were non-families. 12.5% of all households were made up of individuals, and 3.4% had someone living alone who was 65 years of age or older. The average household size was 2.65 and the average family size was 2.79.

In the city, the population was spread out, with 19.7% under the age of 18, 7.3% from 18 to 24, 24.0% from 25 to 44, 37.3% from 45 to 64, and 11.6% who were 65 years of age or older. The median age was 44 years. For every 100 females, there were 89.4 males. For every 100 females age 18 and over, there were 94.8 males.

The median income for a household in the city was $51,250, and the median income for a family was $53,542. Males had a median income of $40,313 versus $33,333 for females. The per capita income for the city was $25,234. None of the families and 2.7% of the population were living below the poverty line, including no under eighteens and 13.6% of those over 64.

== History ==
The city of Hays was founded in the 1970s following a movement to incorporate the Country Estates subdivision.

== Education ==
The city is served by the Hays Consolidated Independent School District.
