= San Marcos Regional Airport =

Public airport in Caldwell County, Texas, United States

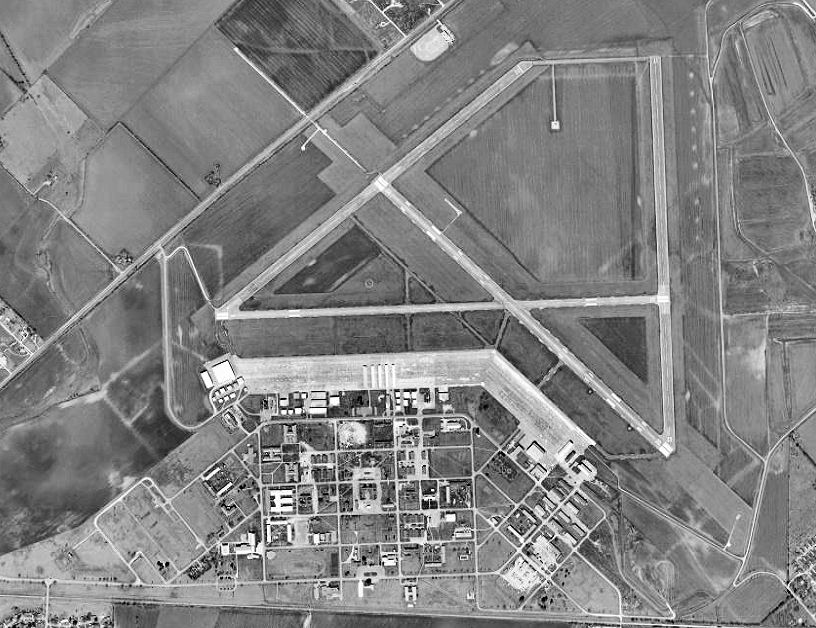
- USGS aerial photo - 28 January 1995
- IATA: none; ICAO: KHYI; FAA LID: HYI

Summary
- Airport type: Public
- Owner/Operator: City of San Marcos
- Serves: San Marcos, Texas
- Location: San Marcos, Caldwell County, Texas, U.S.
- Elevation AMSL: 595 ft / 181 m
- Coordinates: 29°53′34″N 097°51′47″W

Map
- Location of airport in Texas / United States KHYI/HYI (the United States)

Runways
Direction	Length		Surface
Direction	ft	m	Surface
08/26	6,330	1,929	Asphalt
13/31	5,601	1,707	Asphalt
17/35	5,214	1,589	Asphalt

Statistics (2023)
- Aircraft operations (year ending 6/5/2023): 91,849
- Based aircraft: 219
- Source: Federal Aviation Administration

San Marcos Regional Airport (ICAO: KHYI, FAA LID: HYI) is a public use airport located in Caldwell County, Texas, United States. It is 4 nmi (7.4 km) east of the central business district of San Marcos, a city that is mostly in Hays County. The airport is owned by the City of San Marcos and operated by Texas Aviation Partners. It is located east of the border of Caldwell County and Hays County. Before it was operated as a civilian airport it was known as Gary Air Force Base.

Although most U.S. airports use the same three-letter location identifier for the FAA and IATA, San Marcos Regional Airport is assigned HYI by the FAA but has no designation from the IATA.

== History ==
=== Military ===
It was the site of the Gary Army Airfield

=== Civilian ===
Organized San Marcans fought to save the base, and on November 20, 1964, President Lyndon B. Johnson announced in a speech at his alma mater, Southwest Texas State College (Note: Johnson's alma mater is now known as Texas State University. It was called Southwest Texas State College at the time of Johnson's 1964 speech, and Southwest Texas State Teachers College during his time as a student. It was founded in 1899 under the name Southwest Texas State Normal School.) that the abandoned Camp Gary would be the site of a new federal vocational training facility called Job Corps. Today it's known as the Gary Job Corps Center, the largest in the nation.

In 2014, the airport was selected to be the location for the Aircraft Owners and Pilots Association's regional fly-in.

== Facilities and aircraft ==
San Marcos Regional Airport covers an area of 1,303 acres (527 ha) at an elevation of 595 feet (181 m) above mean sea level. It has three asphalt paved runways: 8/26 is 6,330 by 100 feet (1,929 x 30 m), 13/31 is 5,601 by 150 feet (1,707 x 46 m) and 17/35 is 5,214 by 100 feet (1,589 x 30 m).

For the 12-month period ending June 5, 2023, the airport had 91,849 aircraft operations, an average of 251 per day: 98% general aviation, 2% military and <1% air taxi. At that time there were 219 aircraft based at this airport: 156 single-engine, 42 multi-engine, 14 jet, and 7 helicopters.

== Accidents and incidents ==
- Two airplanes collided on September 24, 2020 while attempting to land at San Marcos Regional Airport. Two men in one of the planes were injured while the pilot and sole occupant of the second one was uninjured. One of the planes burned and the second one overturned after crashing.

== See also ==
- List of airports in Texas
