= Driftwood, Texas =

- Census-designated place
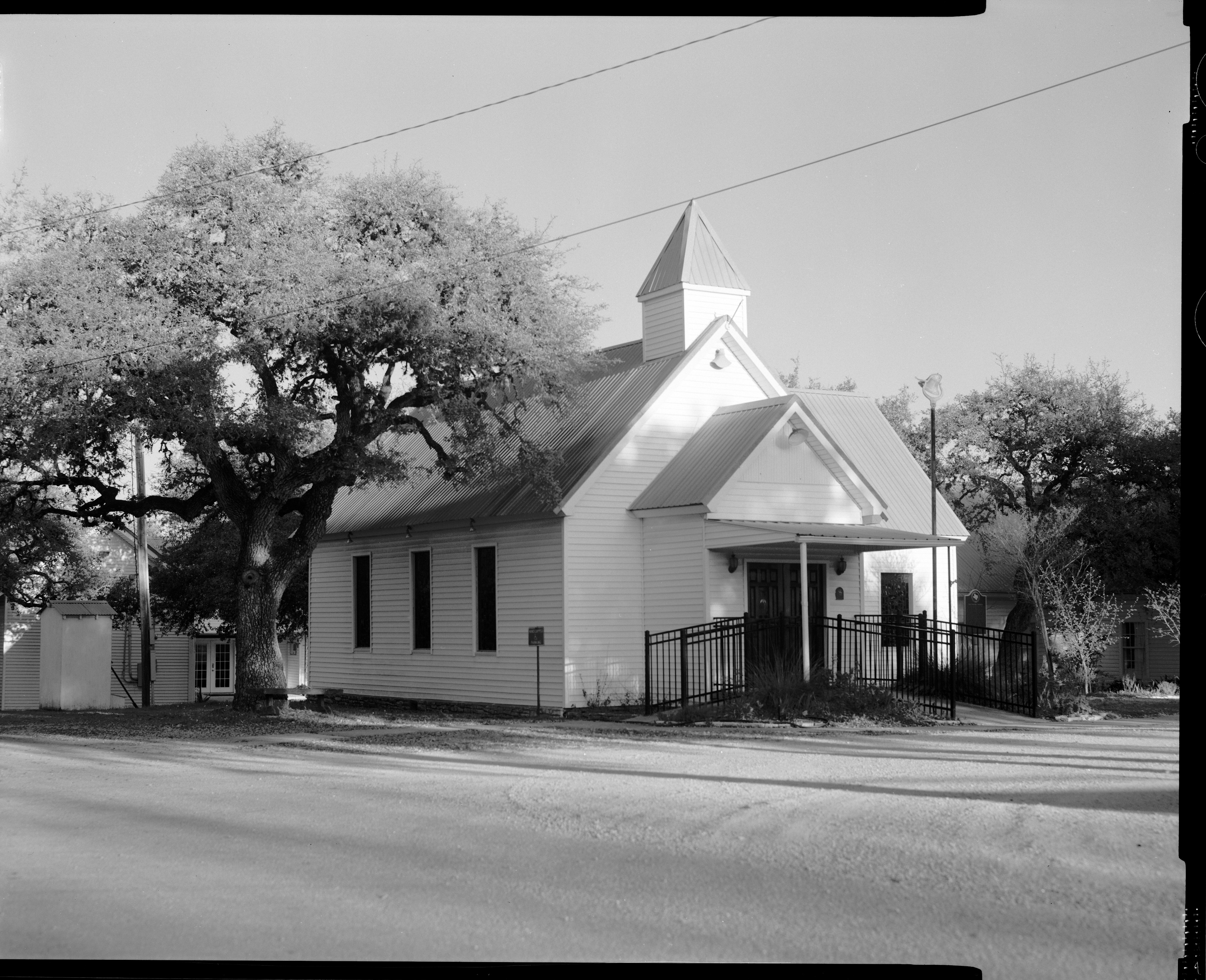
- Church in Driftwood

- Location within Texas Location within the United States
- Coordinates: 30°07′38″N 98°02′08″W
- Country: United States
- State: Texas
- County: Hays

Area
  - Total: 1.29 sq mi (3.35 km^{2})
  - Land: 1.29 sq mi (3.35 km^{2})
  - Water: 0 sq mi (0.0 km^{2})
- Elevation: 1,060 ft (320 m)

Population (2020)
  - Total: 106
  - Density: 82.0/sq mi (31.6/km^{2})
- Time zone: UTC-6 (Central (CST))
  - Summer (DST): UTC-5 (CDT)
- ZIP code: 78619
- FIPS code: 48-21412
- GNIS feature ID: 2629098

Driftwood is a census-designated place in northern Hays County, Texas, United States. Per the 2020 census, its population was 106.

== Geography ==
Driftwood lies along Ranch to Market Road 150, 15 miles (24 km) northwest of Kyle and 24 miles (39 km) southwest of downtown Austin. San Marcos, the Hays county seat, is 25 miles (40 km) south of Driftwood via highway. The community has a post office, with the ZIP code of 78619.

== History ==
Although the earliest settlers arrived in the area now known as Driftwood around 1850, the community was really established in the 1880s. A post office was among the results of the community's significant growth in that decade. Driftwood shrank almost to a ghost town by the early 20th century; although it grew somewhat by the middle of the century, it returned to its almost-deserted state by the 1970s.

Driftwood is home to The Salt Lick, a relatively well-known barbecue restaurant, Trattoria Lisina, Driftwood Estate Winery, the Wildflower Barn Event Center, Stonehouse Villa Wedding Venue, Vista Brewing, the Ragland Ranch & Organic Herb Farm, and the Lazy 8 Ranch.

== Demographics ==
Historical population
Census	Pop.	Note	%±
2010	144		—
2020	106		−26.4%
U.S. Decennial Census; 1850–1900 1910; 1920 1930 1940; 1950 1960 1970; 1980 1990 2000; 2010 2020

Driftwood first appeared as a census designated place in the 2010 U.S. census.

Driftwood CDP, Texas – Racial and ethnic composition Note: the US Census treats Hispanic/Latino as an ethnic category. This table excludes Latinos from the racial categories and assigns them to a separate category. Hispanics/Latinos may be of any race.
Race / Ethnicity (NH = Non-Hispanic)	Pop 2010	Pop 2020	% 2010	% 2020
White alone (NH)	133	93	92.36%	87.74%
Black or African American alone (NH)	0	0	0.00%	0.00%
Native American or Alaska Native alone (NH)	1	0	0.69%	0.00%
Asian alone (NH)	0	1	0.00%	0.94%
Native Hawaiian or Pacific Islander alone (NH)	0	0	0.00%	0.00%
Other race alone (NH)	0	0	0.00%	0.00%
Mixed race or Multiracial (NH)	2	3	1.39%	2.83%
Hispanic or Latino (any race)	8	9	5.56%	8.49%
Total	144	106	100.00%	100.00%

== Notable people ==
- Bayley Currey, NASCAR driver
- Talmadge L. Heflin, former member of the Texas House of Representatives from District 149 in Harris County
- Erin Zwiener, current member of the Texas House of Representatives for District 45 in Hays County

== Gallery ==
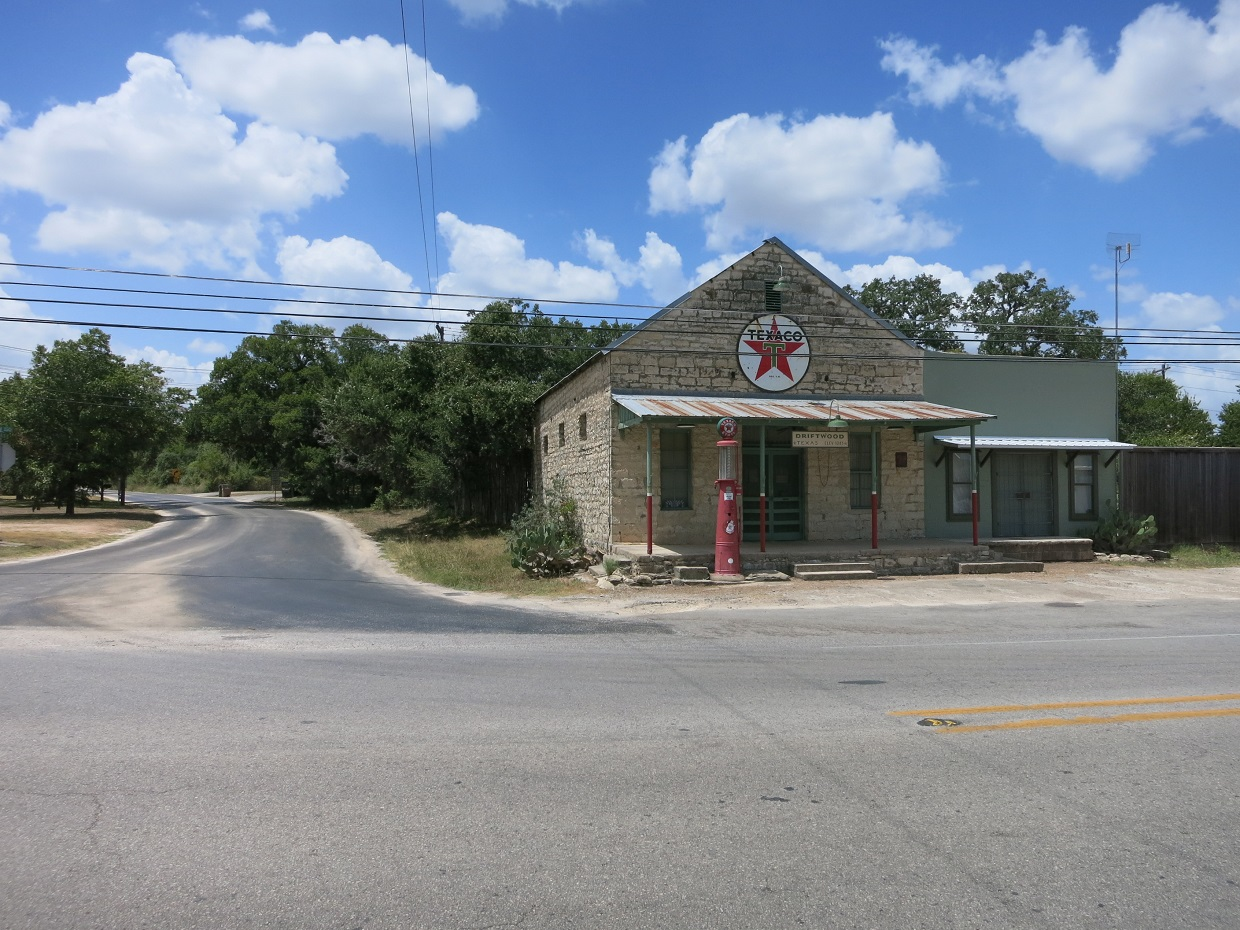
Old Texaco station

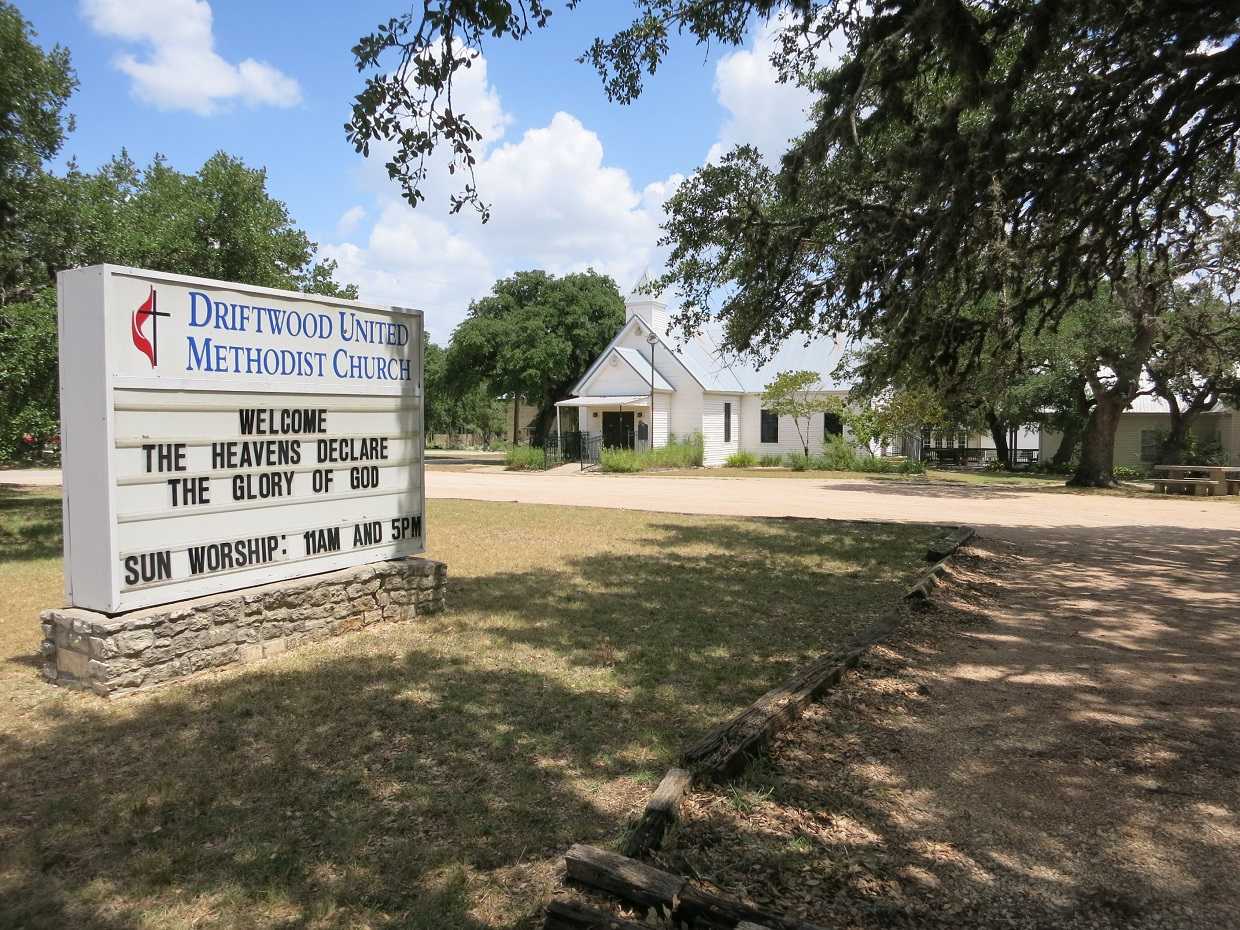
United Methodist Church

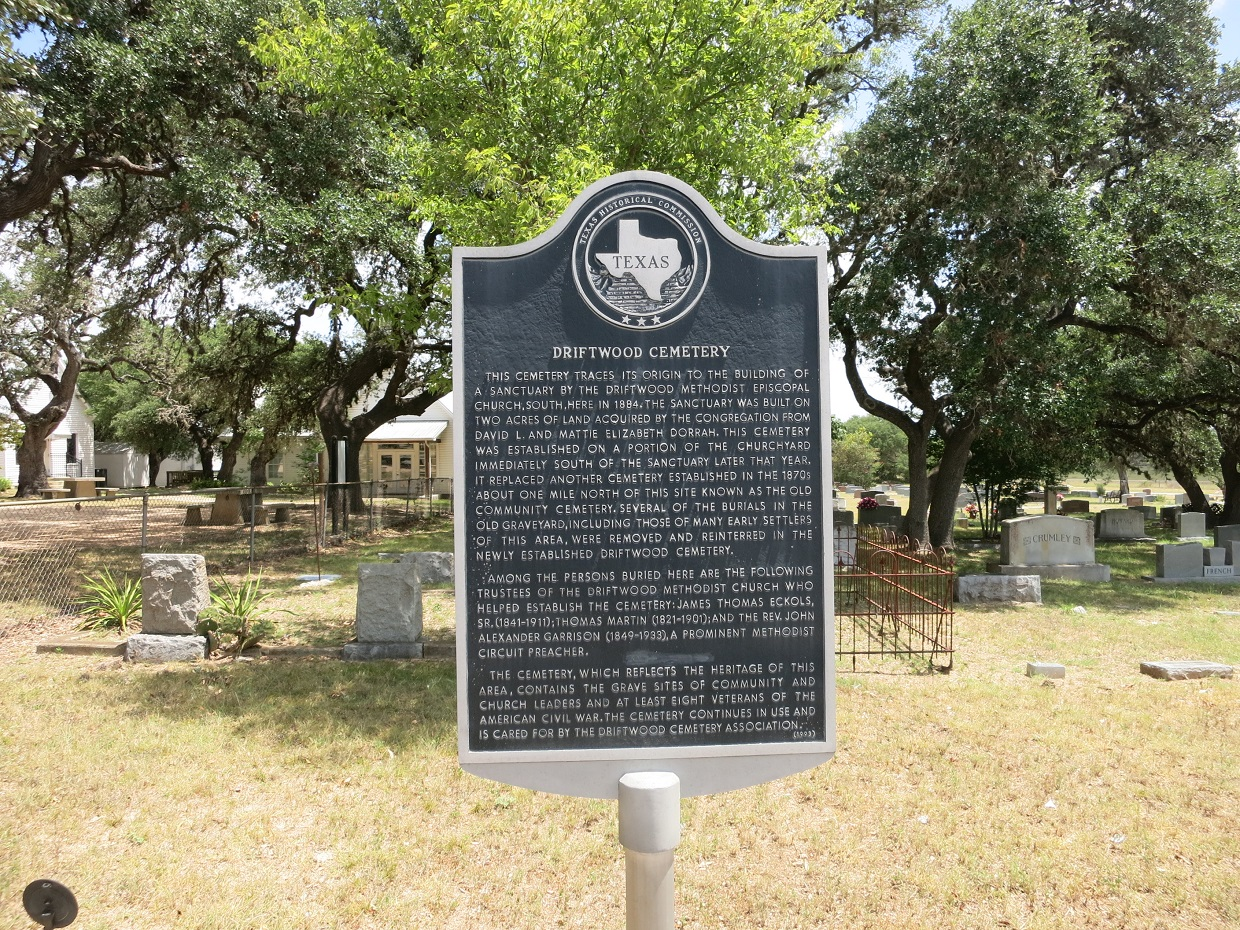
Historic cemetery
