= Hays County, Texas =

County in Texas, United States

- County
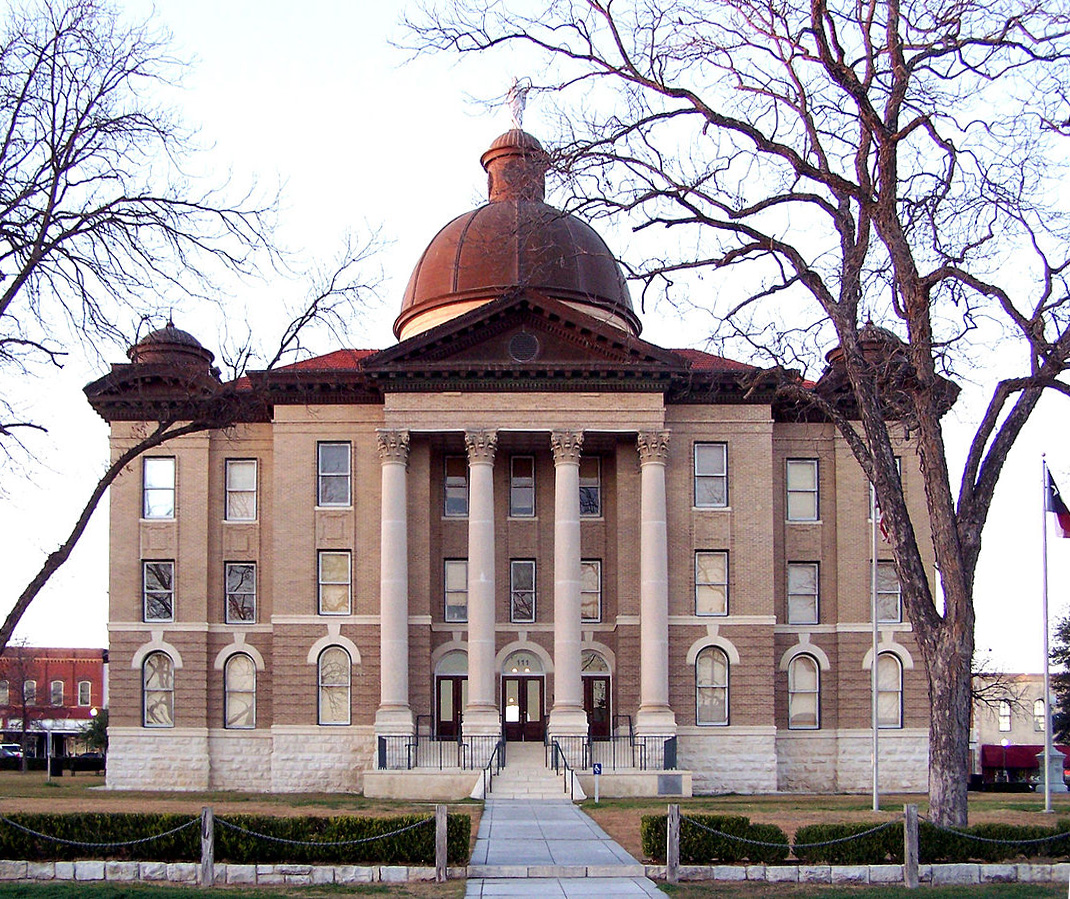
- Hays County Courthouse, built in 1908 using the eclectic style of architecture

- Location within the U.S. state of Texas
- Coordinates: 30°04′N 98°02′W
- Country: United States
- State: Texas
- Founded: 1848
- Named for: John Coffee Hays
- Seat: San Marcos
- Largest city: San Marcos

Area
  - Total: 680 sq mi (1,800 km^{2})
  - Land: 678 sq mi (1,760 km^{2})
  - Water: 1.9 sq mi (4.9 km^{2}) 0.3%

Population (2020)
  - Total: 241,067
  - Estimate (2025): 304,390 ▲
  - Density: 356/sq mi (137/km^{2})
- Time zone: UTC−6 (Central)
  - Summer (DST): UTC−5 (CDT)
- Congressional districts: 21st, 35th
- Website: www.hayscountytx.gov

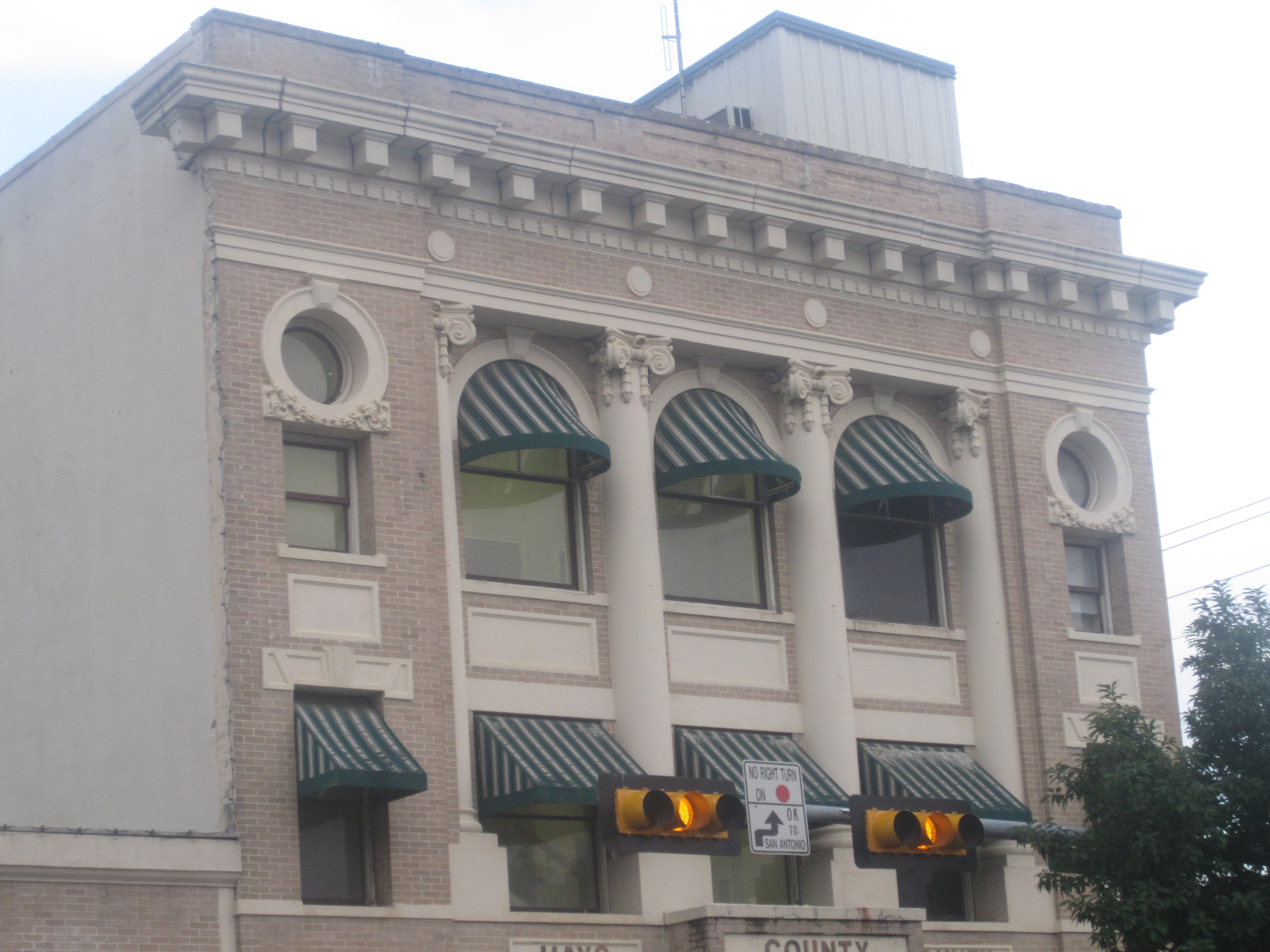
Hays County Annex Building across from the courthouse in San Marcos

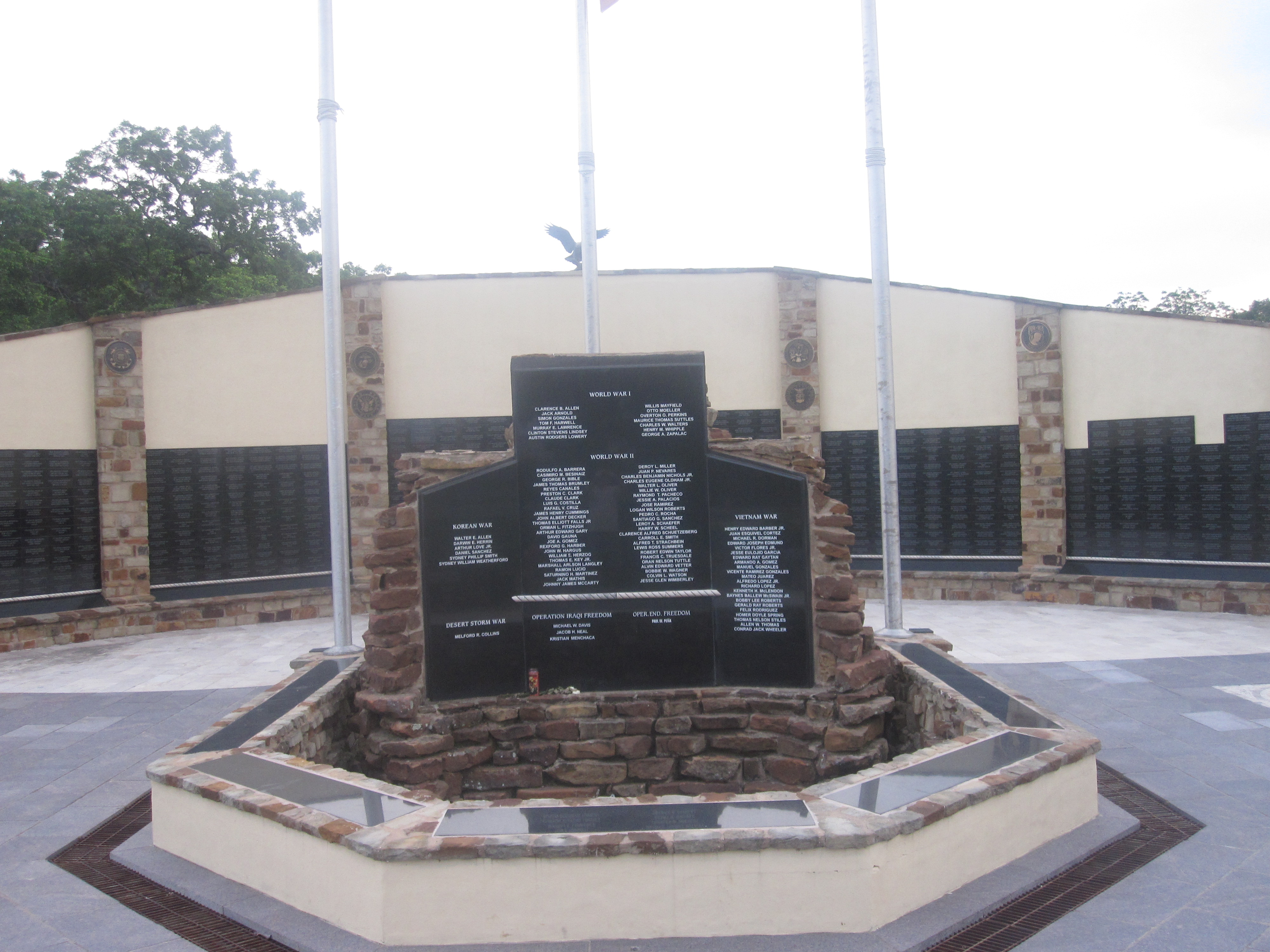
Hays County Veterans Monument in San Marcos

Hays County is a county in the central portion of the U.S. state of Texas. It is part of the Austin-Round Rock metropolitan area. As of the 2020 census, its official population had reached 241,067. The county seat is San Marcos. Hays, along with Comal and Kendall Counties, was listed in 2017 as one of the nation's fastest-growing counties with a population of at least 10,000. From 2015 to 2016, Hays County, third on the national list, had nearly 10,000 new residents during the year.

The county is named for John Coffee Hays, a Texas Ranger and Mexican–American War officer who fought the Texas- Comanche wars of the 1800s.

== History ==
Hays County has been inhabited for thousands of years. Evidence of Paleo-Indians found in the region goes as far back as 6000 BC. Archeological evidence of native agriculture goes back to 1200 AD. The earliest Europeans to arrive in the area were explorers and missionaries from the Spanish Empire. Father Isidro Félix de Espinosa, Father Antonio de San Buenaventura y Olivares, and Pedro de Aguirre traveled through the area in 1709. A few years later, French-Canadian Louis Juchereau de St. Denis was attacked by Comanches in 1714. More permanent European influence was established in 1755, when the Mission San Francisco Xavier de los Dolores was established among the Apache tribe. In 1831, Coahuila y Tejas issued a land grant to Juan Martín de Veramendi, to Juan Vicente Campos in 1832, and to Thomas Jefferson Chambers in 1834. The Mexican government issued a land grant to the first Anglo-American settler in the county, Thomas G. McGhee of Tennessee, in 1835.

On March 1, 1848, the legislature formed Hays County from Travis County. The county is named for Tennessee native Captain John Coffee Hays of the Texas Rangers. San Marcos was named as the county seat. The legislature established Blanco from part of Hays in 1858, but incorporated part of Comal into Hays. Risher and Hall Stage Lines controlled 16 of 31 passenger and mail lines in Texas.

In 1861, voters in the county favored secession from the Union. The next year, the state legislature transferred more of Comal County to Hays County. In 1867, the first cattle drive from Hays County to Kansas occurred.

The International-Great Northern Railroad was completed from Austin to San Marcos in 1880. Camp Ben McCulloch, named after a brigadier general, was organized in 1896 for reunions of United Confederate Veterans. A teacher's college, Southwest Texas State Normal School, was established in San Marcos in 1899.

Wonder Cave opened to the public in 1900. The current Hays County Courthouse in San Marcos was erected in 1908 in Beaux-Arts style by architect C.H. Page and Bros. The Aquarena Springs tourist site opened in 1928 in San Marcos.

Lyndon Baines Johnson graduated from Southwest Texas State Teachers College in 1930. In 1942, construction of San Marcos Army Air Field began. San Marcos Army Air Field was renamed Gary Air Force Base in 1953 to honor Second Lieutenant Arthur Edward Gary, the first San Marcos resident killed in World War II.

The state legislature resurveyed the Hays and Travis County lines, adding 16,000 acres (65 km^{2}) to Hays County, in 1955. In 1964, President Lyndon Johnson announced the establishment of a Job Corps center based at the deactivated Gary Air Force Base.

== Geography ==
According to the U.S. Census Bureau, the county has an area of 680 sq mi (1,800 km^{2}), of which 1.9 sq mi (4.9 km^{2}) (0.3%) are covered by water. The county is predominantly in the Edwards Plateau, with the southeast portion in the Texas Blackland Prairies.

=== Adjacent counties ===
- Travis County (northeast)
- Caldwell County (east)
- Comal County (southwest)
- Guadalupe County (south)
- Blanco County (northwest)

== Transportation ==
=== Major highways ===
- Interstate 35
  - I-35 BL (Kyle)
- U.S. Highway 290
- State Highway 21
- State Highway 80
- State Highway 123
- State Highway 142
- Loop 82

=== Airport ===
- San Marcos Regional Airport - general aviation airport without commercial flights

== Education ==
School districts in Hays County include:

- Blanco
- Comal
- Dripping Springs Independent
- Hays Consolidated Independent
- Johnson City
- San Marcos Consolidated Independent
- Wimberley Independent

As of 2020, the county has six high schools, 10 middle schools, and 24 elementary schools.

Higher education in Hays County includes one four-year institution, Texas State University, in San Marcos.

Austin Community College is the designated community college for the whole county. It operates three distance-learning centers that offer basic and early college start classes, along with testing centers for online classes.

== Demographics ==
Historical population
Census	Pop.	Note	%±
1850	387		—
1860	2,126		449.4%
1870	4,088		92.3%
1880	7,555		84.8%
1890	11,352		50.3%
1900	14,142		24.6%
1910	15,518		9.7%
1920	15,920		2.6%
1930	14,915		−6.3%
1940	15,349		2.9%
1950	17,840		16.2%
1960	19,934		11.7%
1970	27,642		38.7%
1980	40,594		46.9%
1990	65,614		61.6%
2000	97,589		48.7%
2010	157,127		61.0%
2020	241,067		53.4%
2025 (est.)	304,390	▲	26.3%
U.S. Decennial Census 2010 2020

=== Racial and ethnic composition ===
Hays County, Texas – Racial and ethnic composition Note: the US Census treats Hispanic/Latino as an ethnic category. This table excludes Latinos from the racial categories and assigns them to a separate category. Hispanics/Latinos may be of any race.
Race / Ethnicity (NH = Non-Hispanic)	Pop 1980	Pop 1990	Pop 2000	Pop 2010	Pop 2020	% 1980	% 1990	% 2000	% 2010	% 2020
White alone (NH)	26,836	44,661	62,945	92,062	121,568	66.11%	68.07%	64.50%	58.60%	50.43%
Black or African American alone (NH)	1,068	2,091	3,448	4,970	9,004	2.63%	3.19%	3.53%	3.16%	3.74%
Native American or Alaska Native alone (NH)	80	162	368	502	599	0.20%	0.25%	0.38%	0.32%	0.25%
Asian alone (NH)	123	396	740	1,699	4,822	0.30%	0.60%	0.76%	1.08%	2.00%
Native Hawaiian or Pacific Islander alone (NH)	x	x	47	104	144	x	x	0.05%	0.07%	0.06%
Other race alone (NH)	101	55	138	226	1,009	0.25%	0.08%	0.14%	0.14%	0.42%
Mixed race or Multiracial (NH)	x	x	1,044	2,143	11,050	x	x	1.07%	1.36%	4.58%
Hispanic or Latino (any race)	12,386	18,249	28,859	55,401	92,871	30.51%	27.81%	29.57%	35.26%	38.52%
Total	40,594	65,614	97,589	157,107	241,067	100.00%	100.00%	100.00%	100.00%	100.00%

=== 2020 census ===
As of the 2020 census, the county had a population of 241,067 and a median age of 32.3 years. 23.0% of residents were under the age of 18 and 12.2% of residents were 65 years of age or older. For every 100 females there were 96.4 males, and for every 100 females age 18 and over there were 94.6 males age 18 and over.

The racial makeup of the county was 61.0% White, 4.1% Black or African American, 0.9% American Indian and Alaska Native, 2.1% Asian, 0.1% Native Hawaiian and Pacific Islander, 11.7% from some other race, and 20.1% from two or more races. Hispanic or Latino residents of any race comprised 38.5% of the population.

70.3% of residents lived in urban areas, while 29.7% lived in rural areas.

There were 86,904 households in the county, of which 33.4% had children under the age of 18 living in them. Of all households, 48.2% were married-couple households, 19.6% were households with a male householder and no spouse or partner present, and 24.9% were households with a female householder and no spouse or partner present. About 24.0% of all households were made up of individuals and 6.9% had someone living alone who was 65 years of age or older.

There were 93,534 housing units, of which 7.1% were vacant. Among occupied housing units, 61.7% were owner-occupied and 38.3% were renter-occupied. The homeowner vacancy rate was 1.5% and the rental vacancy rate was 8.0%.

=== 2010 census ===
As of the 2010 census, the county had a population of 157,127.

A Williams Institute analysis of 2010 census data found about 7.4 same-sex couples per 1,000 households in the county.

=== 2000 census ===
As of the census of 2000, 97,589 people, 51,265 households, and 22,150 families resided in the county. The population density was 144 people per square mile (56 people/km^{2}). The 55,643 housing units averaged 53 units per square mile (20/km^{2}). The racial makeup of the county was 78.92% White, 3.68% Black or African American, 0.69%Native American, 0.79% Asian, 0.07% Pacific Islander, 13.36% from other races, and 2.49% from two or more races. About 29.57% of the population were Hispanic or Latino of any race.

Of the 33,410 households, 34.0% had children under 18 living with them, 53.1% were married couples living together, 9.00% had a female householder with no husband present, and 33.7% were not families; 21.0% of all households were made up of individuals, and 4.9% had someone living alone who was 65 or older. The average household size was 2.69, and the average family size was 3.21.

The county's population was distributed as 24.5% under 18, 20.5% from 18 to 24, 28.2% from 25 to 44, 19.1% from 45 to 64, and 7.7% who were 65 or older. The median age was 28 years. For every 100 females, there were 101.30 males. For every 100 females 18 and over, there were 99.50 males.

The county's median household income was $45,006 and the median family income was $56,287. Males had a median income of $35,209 versus $27,334 for females. The county's per capita income was $19,931. About 6.40% of families and 14.30% of the population were below the poverty line, including 10.30% of those under age 18 and 9.70% of those age 65 or over.

== Government and politics ==
Hays County currently leans towards the Democratic Party in federal elections. The county was strongly Democratic-leaning before the 1970s, then (like some other suburban counties in the state) began trending towards the Republican Party in the 1970s.

The county began trending Democratic again in the late 2010s and early 2020s. It has backed Democrats in most statewide races since 2018, including for President (in 2020 and 2024), despite Democrats losing all statewide races in Texas. In 2024, Kamala Harris became the first Democratic presidential nominee to carry Hays County despite losing the presidential election since 1968.

Until 2020, when Joe Biden won the county with 54.4% of the vote, the last Democrat to carry Hays County in a presidential election was Bill Clinton, with a plurality of 39.8% of the vote in 1992. The last Democrat to win a majority of the vote in the county before 2020 was Jimmy Carter, with 54.4% in 1976. Lloyd Bentsen had been the last Democratic Senate candidate to carry the county, winning 69.2% of the vote in 1988, until 2018, when Beto O'Rourke carried the county with 57.1% of the vote.

United States presidential election results for Hays County, Texas
Year	Republican		Democratic		Third party(ies)	
Year	No.	%	No.	%	No.	%
1912	60	5.63%	939	88.17%	66	6.20%
1916	123	10.86%	995	87.82%	15	1.32%
1920	242	14.61%	1,075	64.92%	339	20.47%
1924	394	18.86%	1,616	77.36%	79	3.78%
1928	1,088	63.70%	620	36.30%	0	0.00%
1932	220	10.73%	1,822	88.88%	8	0.39%
1936	286	12.66%	1,964	86.94%	9	0.40%
1940	453	16.02%	2,371	83.84%	4	0.14%
1944	495	20.39%	1,690	69.60%	243	10.01%
1948	555	18.58%	2,239	74.96%	193	6.46%
1952	2,135	50.74%	2,070	49.19%	3	0.07%
1956	1,873	47.98%	2,017	51.66%	14	0.36%
1960	1,606	35.46%	2,916	64.39%	7	0.15%
1964	1,279	25.26%	3,780	74.64%	5	0.10%
1968	1,993	32.23%	3,546	57.35%	644	10.42%
1972	5,406	56.79%	4,068	42.74%	45	0.47%
1976	5,714	44.38%	7,005	54.41%	156	1.21%
1980	6,517	49.04%	6,013	45.25%	759	5.71%
1984	12,467	64.98%	6,663	34.73%	57	0.30%
1988	11,716	50.36%	11,187	48.09%	361	1.55%
1992	10,008	36.70%	10,842	39.76%	6,417	23.53%
1996	12,865	47.93%	11,580	43.14%	2,395	8.92%
2000	20,170	58.78%	11,387	33.18%	2,760	8.04%
2004	27,021	56.50%	20,110	42.05%	692	1.45%
2008	29,638	50.19%	28,431	48.15%	983	1.66%
2012	31,661	53.65%	25,537	43.27%	1,813	3.07%
2016	33,826	46.87%	33,224	46.04%	5,114	7.09%
2020	47,680	43.59%	59,524	54.41%	2,191	2.00%
2024	58,438	46.44%	65,528	52.08%	1,861	1.48%

United States Senate election results for Hays County, Texas1
Year	Republican		Democratic		Third party(ies)	
Year	No.	%	No.	%	No.	%
2024	54,436	43.35%	67,475	53.73%	3,665	2.92%

United States Senate election results for Hays County, Texas2
Year	Republican		Democratic		Third party(ies)	
Year	No.	%	No.	%	No.	%
2020	49,539	45.64%	55,597	51.22%	3,410	3.14%
2026	39,480	32.97%	77,844	65.00%	2,432	2.03%

Texas Gubernatorial election results for Hays County
Year	Republican		Democratic		Third party(ies)	
Year	No.	%	No.	%	No.	%
2022	39,085	43.58%	48,970	54.60%	1,628	1.82%
2026	42,903	35.73%	75,219	62.65%	1,937	1.61%

Ann Richards in 1990 was the last Democratic gubernatorial candidate to win the county, when she took 56.6% of the vote that year, until 2018, when Lupe Valdez won with a 49.6% plurality.

In the 2022 elections, Democrats won all but one race in Hays County; They flipped several countywide seats previously held by Republicans.

Democratic voters mostly reside along the I-35 Corridor and communities East. Communities West of the I-35 Corridor lean Republican. San Marcos, home of Texas State University, and the city of Kyle generally vote Democratic. Driftwood, Dripping Springs, Wimberley, and Woodcreek generally vote Republican. Elections within the county are often decided by margins in Bear Creek, Belterra, Buda, and the county's north-central border along Travis County.

=== County government ===
==== County Judge and commissioners ====
Position	Name	Party
County Judge	Ruben Becerra	Democratic
Commissioner, Precinct 1	Debbie Ingalsbe	Democratic
Commissioner, Precinct 2	Michelle Cohen	Democratic
Commissioner, Precinct 3	Morgan Hammer	Republican
Commissioner, Precinct 4	Walt Smith	Republican

==== County officials ====
Position	Name	Party
Criminal District Attorney	Kelly Higgins	Democratic
District Clerk	Amanda Calvert	Democratic
County Clerk	Elaine Cárdenas	Democratic
Sheriff	Anthony Hipolito	Republican
Tax Assessor-Collector	Jennifer Escobar	Democratic
Treasurer	Daphne Sanchez Tenorio	Democratic

== Communities ==
=== Cities (multiple counties) ===
- Austin (primarily in Travis County and a small part in Williamson County)
- Niederwald (partly in Caldwell County)
- San Marcos (county seat) (small parts in Caldwell and Guadalupe counties)
- Uhland (partly in Caldwell County)

=== Cities ===
- Buda
- Dripping Springs
- Hays
- Kyle
- Mountain City
- Wimberley
- Woodcreek

=== Village ===
- Bear Creek

=== Census-designated places ===
- Belterra
- Driftwood

=== Ghost town ===
- Goforth

== Gallery ==
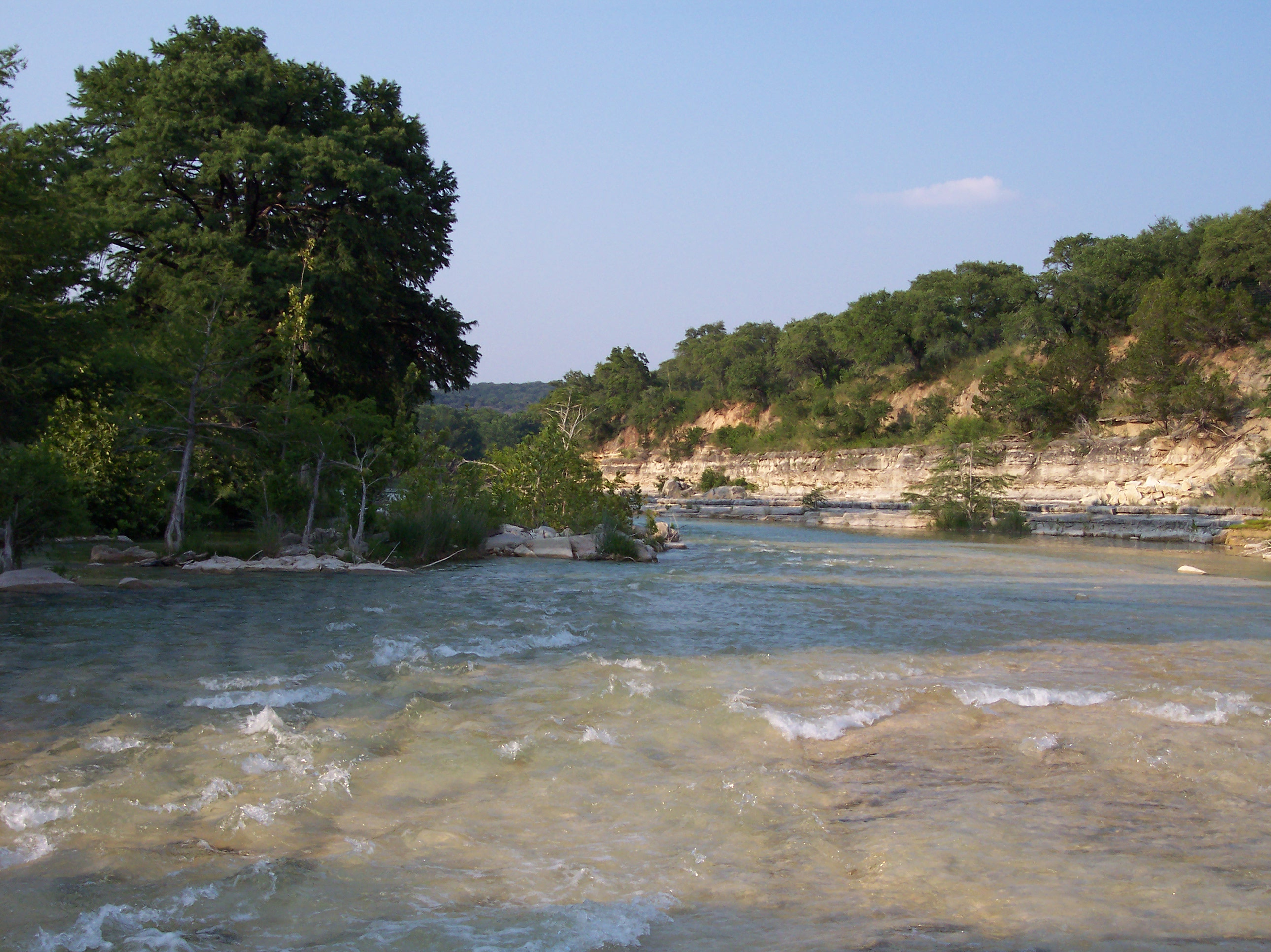
Blanco River

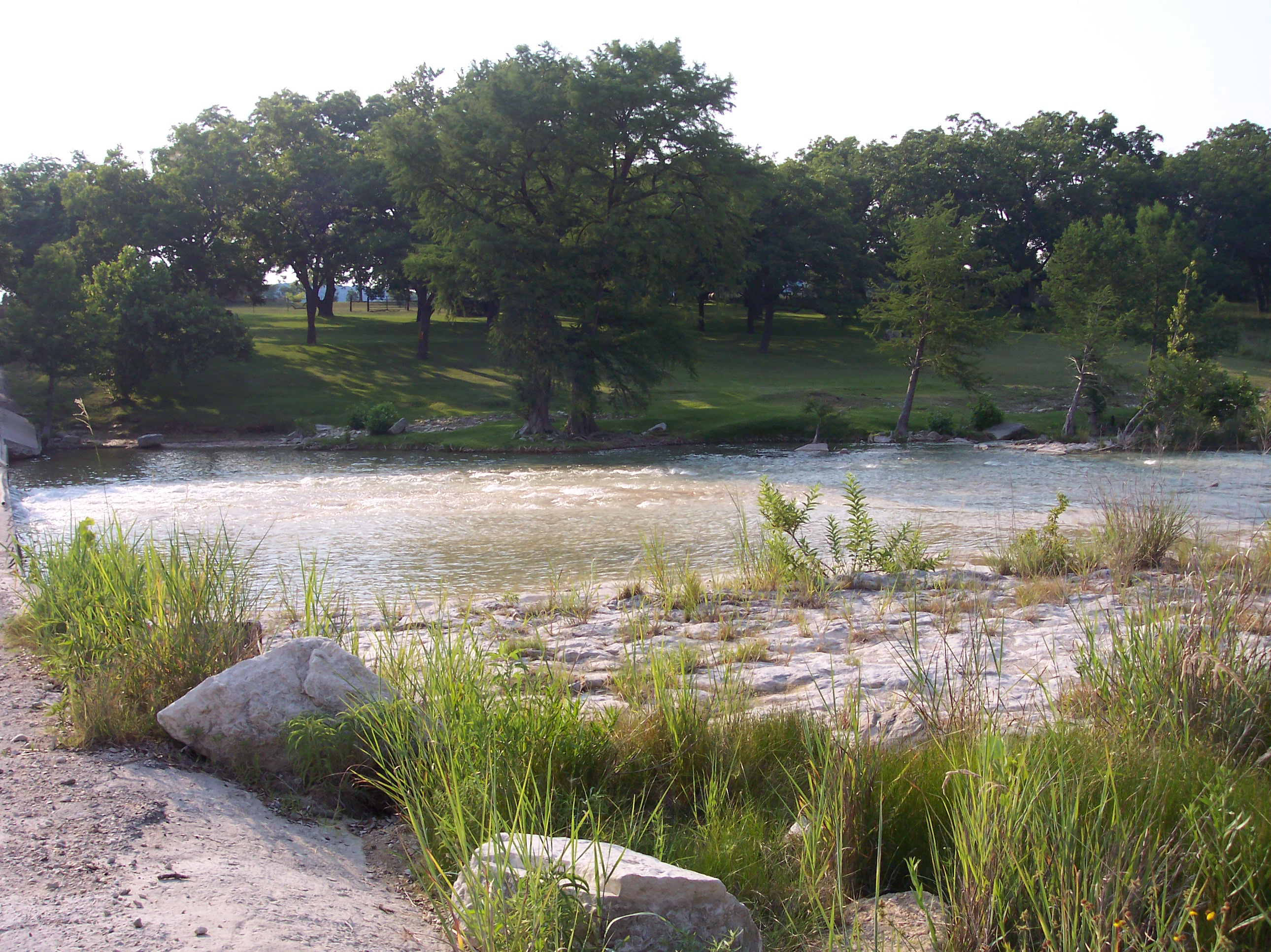
Another view of the Blanco River

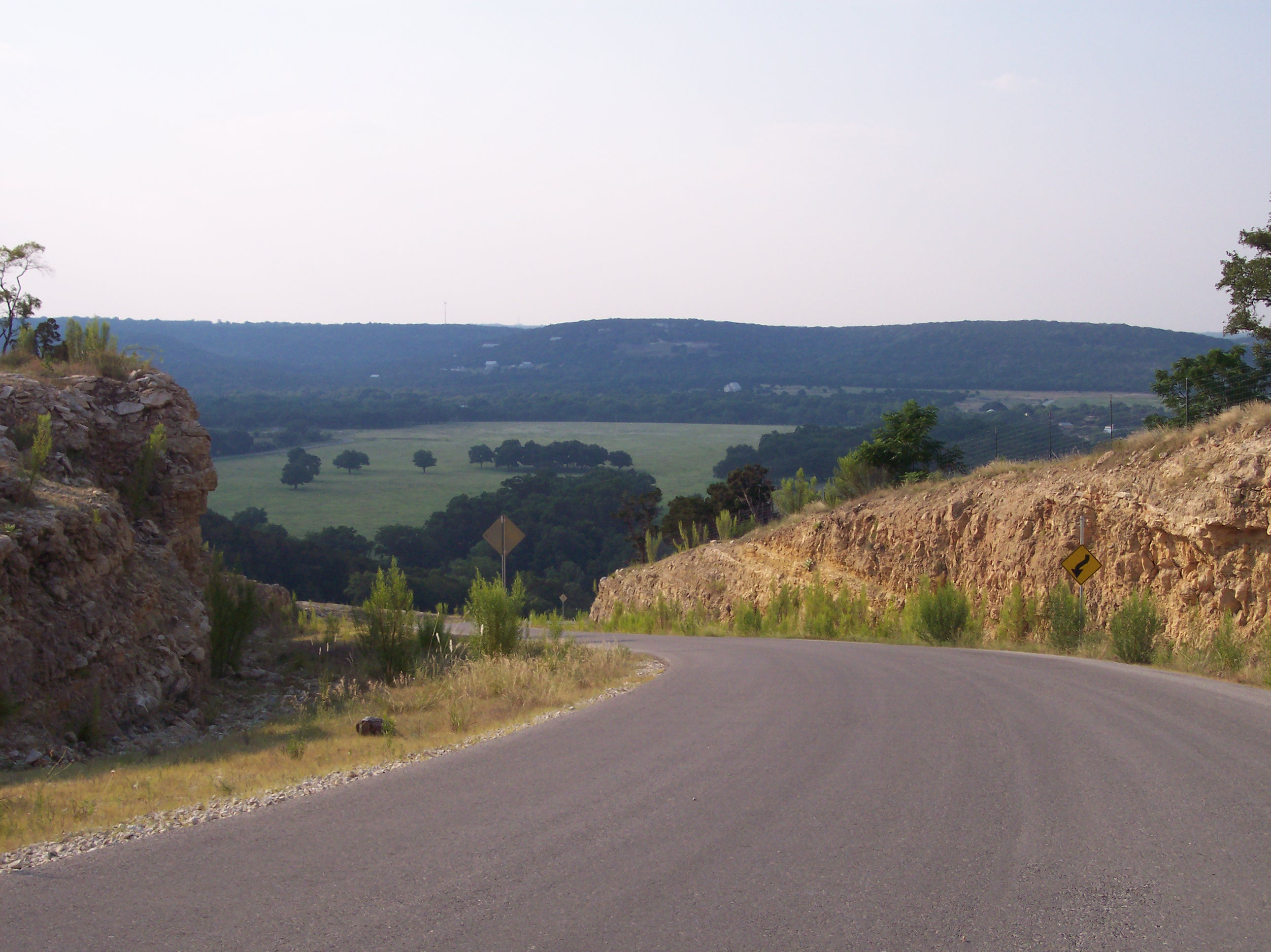
Texas Hill Country

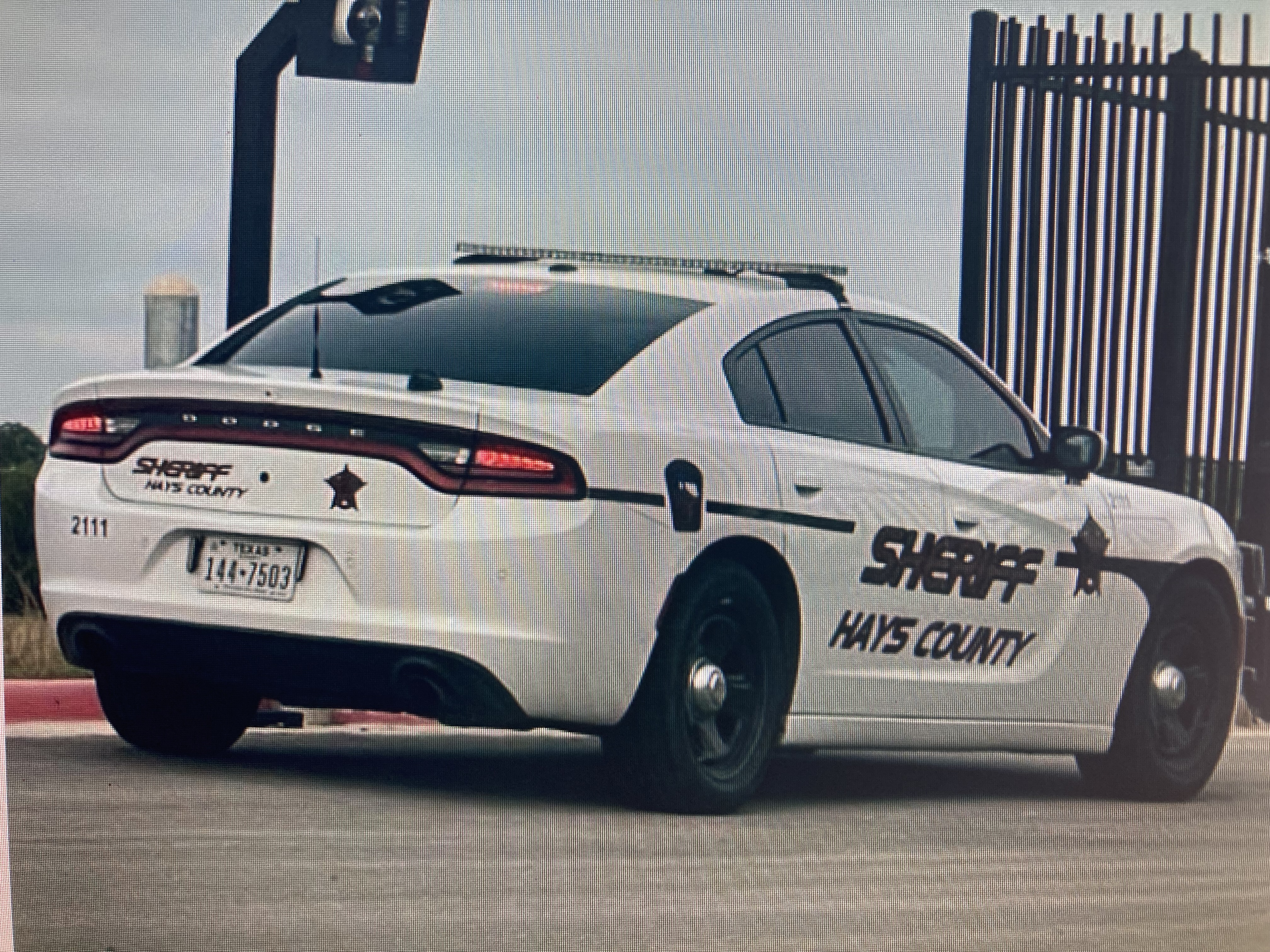

== See also ==
- List of museums in Central Texas
- National Register of Historic Places listings in Hays County, Texas
- Recorded Texas Historic Landmarks in Hays County
