= Dripping Springs, Texas =

- City
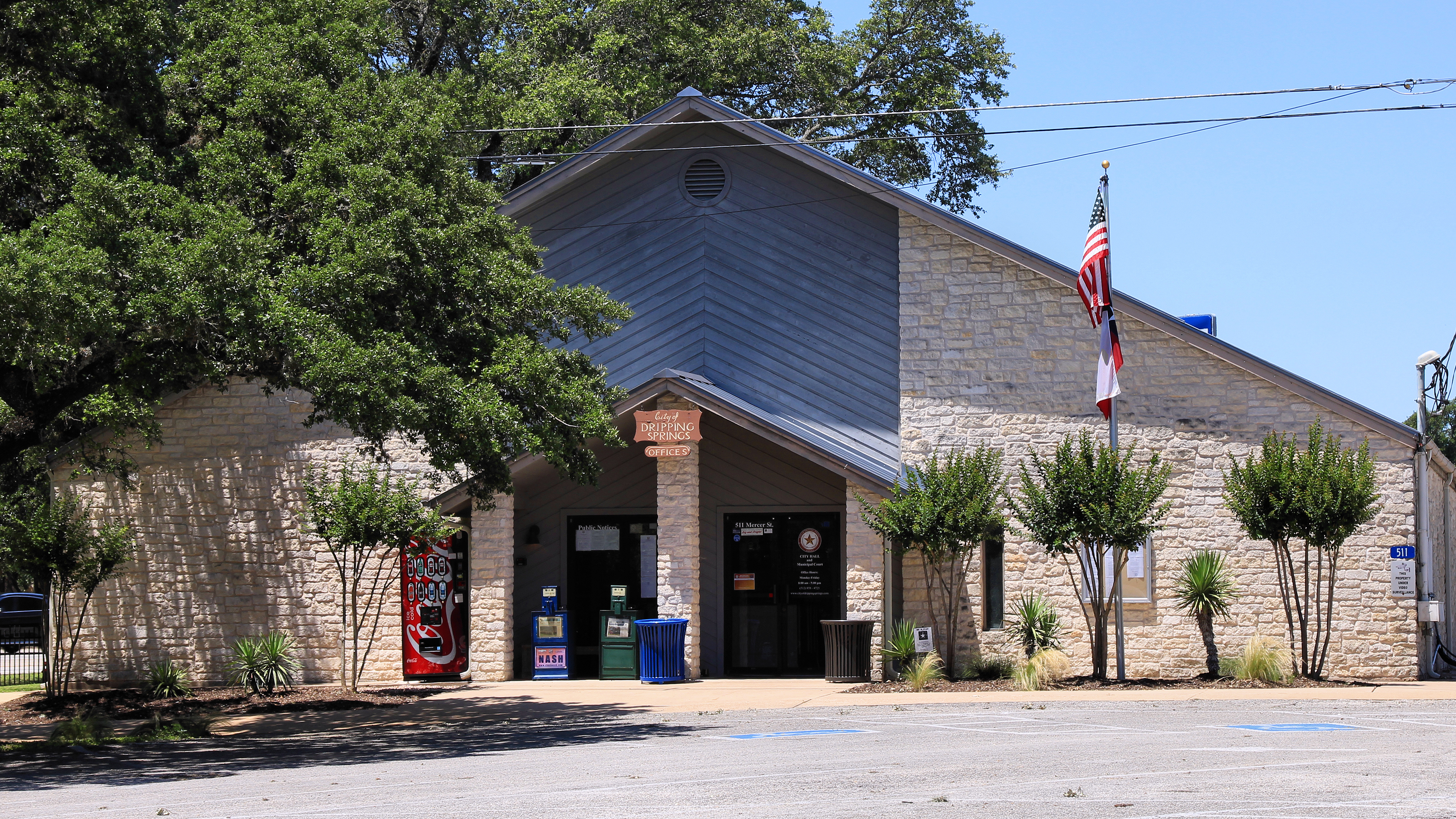
- City Hall (2019)
- Motto: "Gateway to the Hill Country"
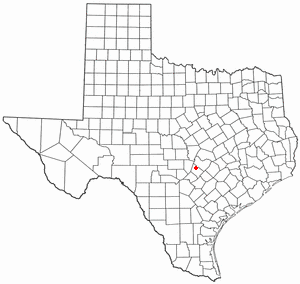
- Location of Dripping Springs, Texas

- Coordinates: 30°12′09″N 98°05′07″W
- Country: United States
- State: Texas
- County: Hays
- Incorporated: 1981

Area
  - Total: 8.80 sq mi (22.78 km^{2})
  - Land: 8.80 sq mi (22.78 km^{2})
  - Water: 0 sq mi (0.00 km^{2})
- Elevation: 1,168 ft (356 m)

Population (2020)
  - Total: 4,650
  - Estimate (2025): 11,167
  - Density: 529/sq mi (204.1/km^{2})
- Time zone: UTC-6 (Central (CST))
  - Summer (DST): UTC-5 (CDT)
- ZIP Code: 78620
- Area code(s): 512 & 737
- FIPS code: 48-21424
- GNIS feature ID: 2410357
- Website: www.drippingspringstx.gov

Dripping Springs is a city in Hays County, Texas, United States. The population was 4,650 at the 2020 census. It is part of the Greater Austin metropolitan area.

== Geography ==
Dripping Springs is in northern Hays County on U.S. Route 290, which leads east 23 miles (37 km) to Austin and west 24 miles (39 km) to Johnson City.

According to the United States Census Bureau, the city has a total area of 3.9 square miles (10.0 km^{2}), all land. Most of the city drains southwest to Onion Creek, an east-flowing tributary of the Colorado River.

The town bills itself as the "Gateway to the Hill Country," referring to the 25-county region known as the Texas Hill Country.

=== Climate ===
The climate in this area is characterized by hot, humid summers and generally mild to cool winters. According to the Köppen climate classification system, Dripping Springs has a humid subtropical climate, Cfa on climate maps.

== Demographics ==
Historical population
Census	Pop.	Note	%±
1990	1,033		—
2000	1,548		49.9%
2010	1,788		15.5%
2020	4,650		160.1%
2025 (est.)	11,167		140.2%
U.S. Decennial Census

=== 2020 census ===
As of the 2020 census, Dripping Springs had a population of 4,650. The median age was 40.5 years, 25.5% of residents were under the age of 18, and 19.7% of residents were 65 years of age or older. For every 100 females there were 91.8 males, and for every 100 females age 18 and over there were 87.4 males age 18 and over.

6.7% of residents lived in urban areas, while 93.3% lived in rural areas.

There were 1,775 households and 1,278 families in Dripping Springs, of which 38.1% had children under the age of 18 living in them. Of all households, 55.3% were married-couple households, 13.2% were households with a male householder and no spouse or partner present, and 27.4% were households with a female householder and no spouse or partner present. About 25.5% of all households were made up of individuals and 16.3% had someone living alone who was 65 years of age or older.

There were 2,024 housing units, of which 12.3% were vacant. The homeowner vacancy rate was 3.5% and the rental vacancy rate was 15.3%.

Racial composition as of the 2020 census
Race	Number	Percent
White	3,557	76.5%
Black or African American	49	1.1%
American Indian and Alaska Native	53	1.1%
Asian	57	1.2%
Native Hawaiian and Other Pacific Islander	4	0.1%
Some other race	282	6.1%
Two or more races	648	13.9%
Hispanic or Latino (of any race)	989	21.3%

=== 2010 census ===
As of the 2010 census, 1,788 people, 662 households, and 455 families resided in the town. The population density was 468.7 inhabitants per square mile (181.0/km^{2}). The 723 housing units averaged 176.8 per square mile (68.3/km^{2}). The racial makeup of the town was 81.50% White, 0.90% African American, 1.30% Native American, 0.10% Asian, 16.2% from other races, and 2.0% from two or more races. Hispanics or Latinos of any race were 29.10% of the population.

Of the 662 households, 23.4% had children under the age of 18 living with them, 52.9% were married couples living together, 11.2% had a female householder with no husband present, and 31.3% were not families. About 26.0% of all households were made up of individuals, and 25.5% had someone living alone who was 65 years of age or older. The average household size was 2.69, and the medium family size was 3.23.

In the town, the population was distributed as 30.3% under the age of 19, 5.6% from 18 to 24, 24.9% from 25 to 44, 26.7% from 45 to 64, and 12.6% who were 65 years of age or older. The median age was 37.8 years. For every 100 females, there were 105.3 males. For every 100 females age 18 and over, there were 103.9 males.

The median income for a household in the town was $55,288, and the median income for a family was $61,875. Males had a median income of $51,307 versus $39,798 for females. The per capita income for the town was $28,482. About 5.7% of families and 10.7% of the population were below the poverty line, including 11.4% of those under age 18 and 5.0% of those age 65 or over.

== Economy ==
Dripping Springs is part of the Sustainable Places Project, an initiative to help Dripping Springs and other Central Texas cities create livable places that reflect community goals as the cities grow.

An HEB grocery store and Home Depot are located near the junction of U.S. Highway 290 and RR 12. Dripping Springs is also the wedding capital of Texas and a tourist spot. The town and surrounding area is recognized as a brewery, distillery, and winery destination.

In 2014, Dripping Springs began to attract a new breed of tourists when it was named a Dark Sky Community, the first in Texas. The International Dark-Sky Association made the designation in recognition of the town's 2011 lighting ordinance that reduced outdoor lighting to a minimum. On the last weekend of March, Dripping Springs now hosts annual Dark Sky festivals drawing thousands of Astro-tourists.

== Education ==
The city is served by the Dripping Springs Independent School District. The city has one high school, two middle schools, and six elementary schools. The district was reclassified as 6A in 2022. Private schools include Appamada School (K-12), Acton Academy (K-5), and AESA Prep Academy (K-12). The area is also served by the Pinnacle Campus of Austin Community College.

== Notable people ==
- Kyle Chandler, actor (Early Edition, Friday Night Lights, Bloodline)
- Cameron Duddy, music video producer and bassist for Midland
- Johnny Gimble, fiddle player and songwriter, who played with Bob Wills and His Texas Playboys
- John F. Gregory, optical engineer and designer of the Gregory-Maksutov telescope
- Woody Harrelson, actor
- E. D. Hill, former host of Fox and Friends
- Jesse James, television personality, motorcycle builder, firearm builder
- Roger A. Keats, member of the Illinois Senate from 1979 to 1992. He moved to Dripping Springs in 2013
- Ben Kweller, musician
- Pat Mastelotto, musician
- Adam Narkiewicz, a.k.a. 'Akira the Don', hip-hop musician
- Israel Nash (Israel Nash Gripka), singer/songwriter
- Kurt Neumann, lead singer and guitarist of BoDeans
- Dave Pelz, American golf coach and author
- Slim Richey, musician
- Gregg Rolie, founding member of the bands Santana and Journey
- Patrick Rose, lawyer, former state representative, and subject of the documentary Last Man Standing: Politics—Texas Style
- Leonidas Johnson Rountree, newspaper publisher, born here in 1868
- Phillip Sandifer, songwriter, recording artist
- Tucker Max, writer, New York Times best selling author of I Hope They Serve Beer in Hell

== In popular culture ==
The Grammy-nominated neotraditional country band Midland was formed in Dripping Springs in 2014. The trio, consisting of Mark Wystrach, Jess Carson, and bassist Cameron Duddy, developed their signature sound in the area, frequently citing the town's landscape as an influence on their music. In 2026, the band remains a prominent cultural representative of the city, with members maintaining residences on local ranches that serve as creative hubs for their songwriting and rehearsals.

A fictionalized version of Dripping Springs, TX is the home of DC Comics' character Jinny Hex from the superhero team Young Justice.

Johnny Cash wrote and recorded the song "Down At Drippin' Springs," featured on his 1975 album Look at Them Beans. The song pays tribute to the Texas Hill Country and is tied to the 1972 Dripping Springs Reunion, a festival that inspired Willie Nelson's Fourth of July Picnics. The song is available on youtube on the Official Johnny Cash page.
