= Rastegar Property Company =

American real estate investment company

Rastegar Property Company, LLC
- Type: Privately held company
- Industry: Real estate
- Predecessors: Rastegar Capital (2015–2018); Rastegar Equity Partners (2018–2020); `
- Founded: 2015; 11 years ago
- Founder: Ari Rastegar
- Headquarters: Austin, Texas, United States
- Area served: United States
- Key people: Ari Rastegar (founder and CEO)
- Products: Real estate investment, development and asset management
- Website: rastegarproperty.com

Rastegar Property Company, LLC is an American real estate investment and development firm headquartered in Austin, Texas. It focuses on the acquisition, development and management of multifamily and other commercial properties in high-growth markets across the United States, particularly in the Sun Belt.

== History ==
Ari Rastegar, originally from Texas and possessing a background in real estate law and investment, founded Rastegar Capital in 2015. The private real estate investment firm underwent rebranding in 2018, becoming Rastegar Equity Partners, and eventually Rastegar Property Company. Initially concentrating on the Austin real estate market, Rastegar aimed to form a company using advanced technology and data analytics for the identification and capitalization of undervalued properties in expanding markets. Kellie Rastegar, who is ex-creative director of Rastegar Property Company.

By early 2017, the company reported approximately US$500 million in assets under management across its various strategies. In January 2021, Rastegar launched the Rastegar Opportunity REIT, a US$200 million real estate investment trust aimed at acquiring older multifamily properties across the Sun Belt that could be renovated and repositioned.

As of spring 2021, the firm reported at least 4.9 million square feet of real estate in development across 34 cities in twelve U.S. states. By 2024 its portfolio included nine projects in Texas and Arizona, totalling more than 5.6 million square feet and roughly US$1.5 billion in value, with plans to develop nearly 6,000 multifamily units over a three- to five-year period.

== Portfolio ==
Rastegar Property Company's portfolio encompasses a diverse range of assets, including multifamily, office, retail, and industrial properties. The company has a strong presence in major metropolitan areas, such as Austin, Miami, and New York City, and continues to expand its footprint in emerging markets throughout the United States. As of January 2017, the firm managed assets worth $500 million. As of Spring 2021, the firm had a portfolio comprising at least 4.9 million square feet of real estate in development, encompassing projects in 34 cities across 12 states in the United States.

In 2023, Rastegar Property Company donated 11-acre land to Hays Consolidated Independent School District board for Texas' 17th elementary school. The donated land is part of the 318-acre, 700 Bunton Lane development project, located on the eastern side of Kyle, is set to feature a mix of single-family and multi-family homes, parks, trails, and other amenities, including the new elementary school.

=== 1899 McKinney living wall project ===
In 2020, Rastegar announced plans for a 26-storey residential tower at 1899 McKinney Avenue in Dallas, featuring a planted façade described as the tallest living wall in North America. The project, designed by architecture firm Solomon Cordwell Buenz in collaboration with green wall company Zauben, is planned to incorporate around 40,000 plants on the tower’s exterior, with sensors and an irrigation system intended to monitor plant health and improve local air quality. The residential tower is expected to include approximately 270 condominiums, ground-floor retail space, a pocket park maintained by the developer and an underground car park.

== Community involvement ==
In February 2023 the Hays Consolidated Independent School District board voted to accept an 11-acre land donation from Rastegar Property Company within the firm’s 700 Bunton Lane/Infinity Square development in Kyle, Texas, as the site for the district’s 17th elementary school.

Rastegar and his family have also support charitable initiatives in the Austin area, including donations and community-focused events organised through the company and its principals.
