= Falcon International Bank =

Coordinates: 27.5443°N 99.4821°W

- Company type: Corporation
- Industry: Finance and Insurance
- Founded: 1986
- Headquarters: Laredo, Texas
- Key people: Adolfo E. Gutierrez, Gilbert Narvaez, Jr.
- Products: Banking; Insurance; Financial services Trust services
- Website: www.falconbank.com

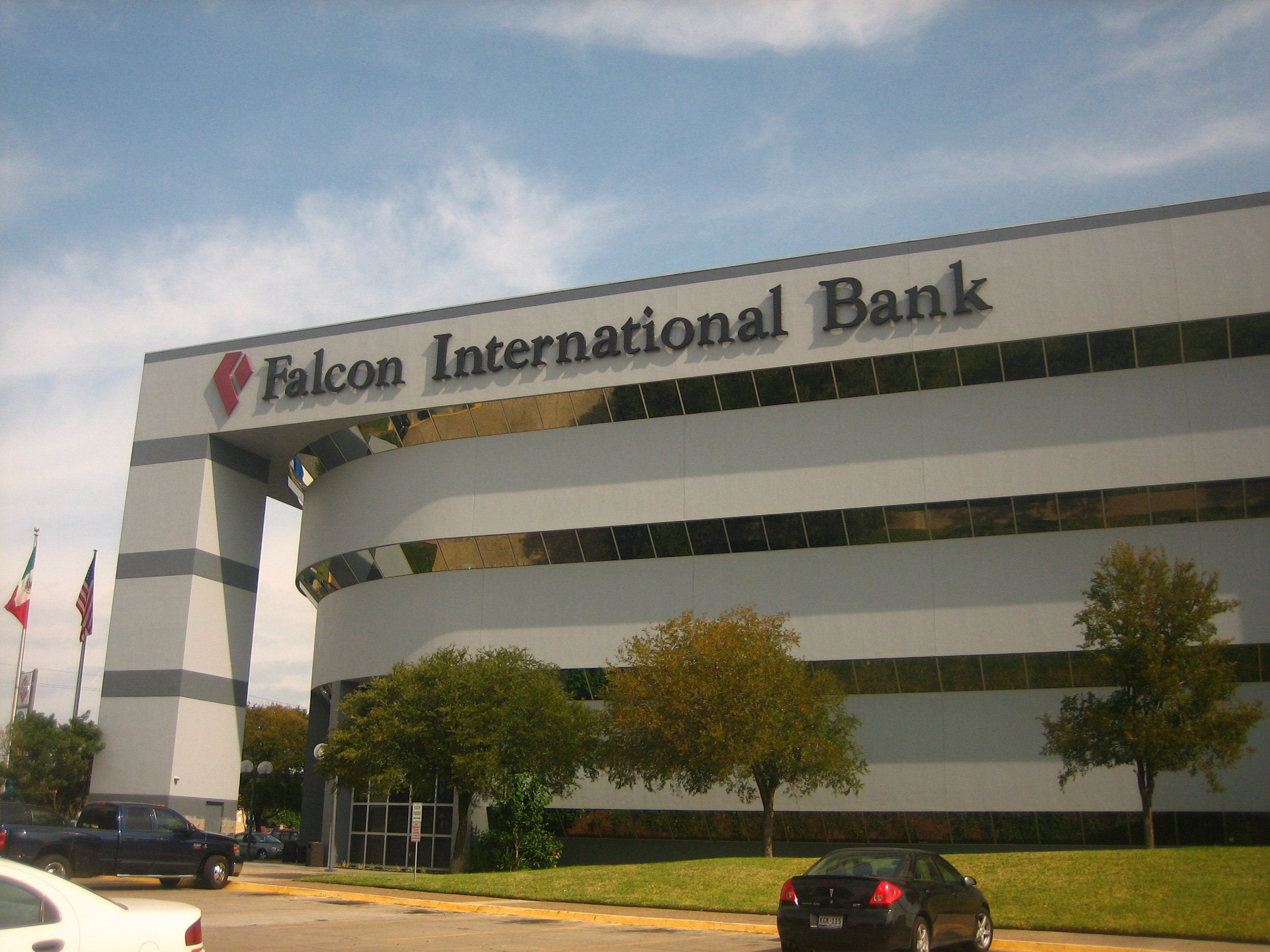
Falcon International Bank headquarters is a modern 4-story building at the intersection of McPherson and Hillside in Laredo, Texas.

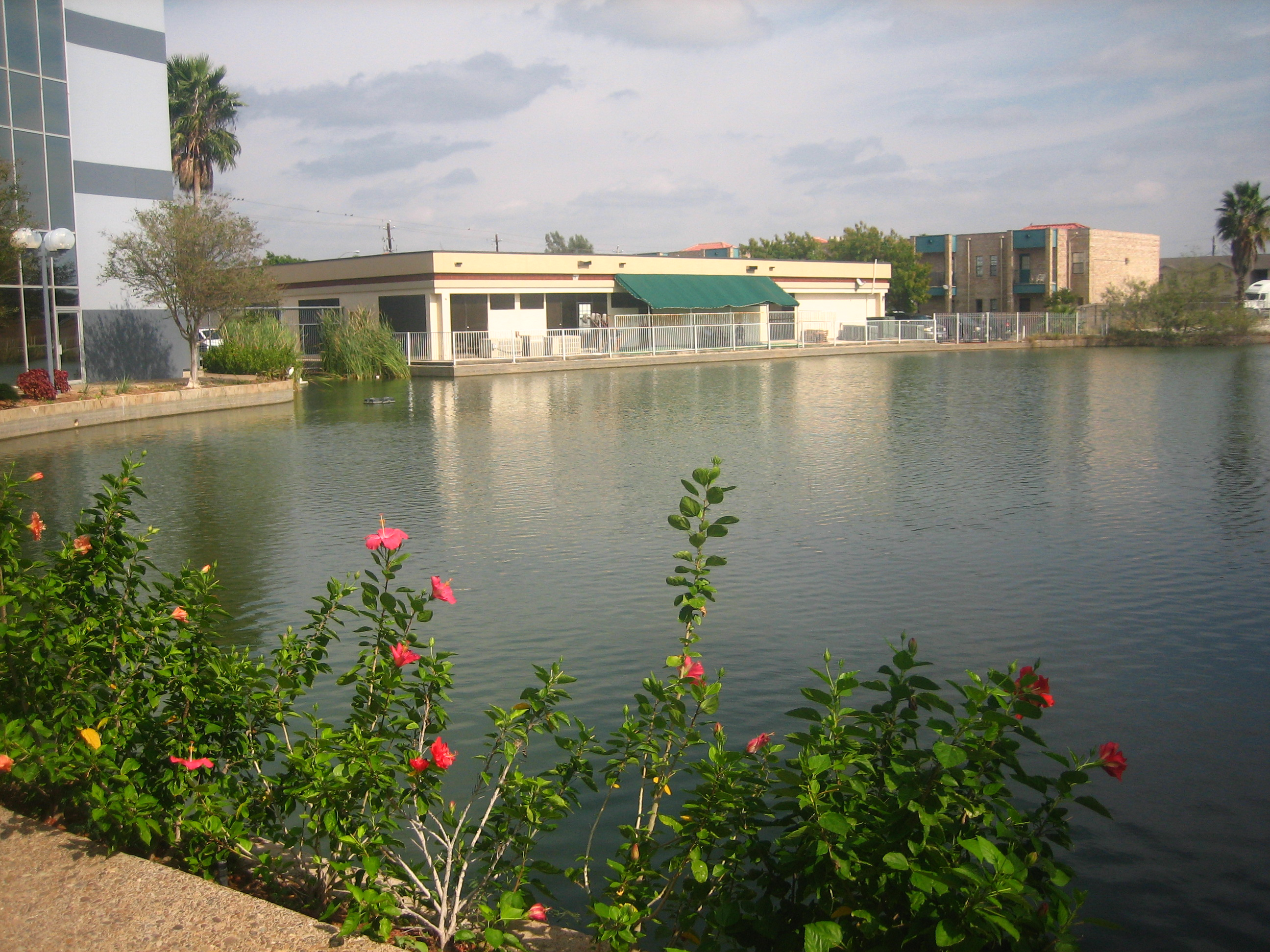
The reflecting pool at Falcon Bank in Laredo

Falcon International Bank is a Texas community bank founded in 1986 and headquartered in Laredo, Texas. Falcon's current owners, the Gutierrez family, acquired the bank in 1995. The institution has since grown from a staff of 20 employees and $52 million in assets to nearly 400 employees and more than $1.7 billion as of October 1, 2021. Falcon International Bank is headed by Gilbert Narvaez, Jr., the president and chief executive officer with Adolfo E. Gutierrez serving as the chairman of the board.

Falcon has been listed on Hispanic Business magazine's annual Hispanic 500 directory which lists the 500 largest Hispanic-owned businesses in the U.S.

== Locations ==
Falcon International Bank's Texas branches are located in Laredo, San Antonio, McAllen, Brownsville, Eagle Pass, Del Rio, and Buda with a Loan Production Office in Austin and also maintains two representative offices in Monterrey and Guadalajara, Mexico.

Brownsville, Texas 2
Buda, Texas 1
Del Rio, Texas 2
Eagle Pass, Texas 2
Austin, Texas 1
Laredo, Texas 5
McAllen, Texas 3
San Antonio, Texas 3
Monterrey, Nuevo León 1
Guadalajara, Jalisco 1

Total: 18 Branches
