= Fitzhugh Andrews =

American pianist and composer

Fitzhugh Lee Andrews (February 12, 1873 – March 10, 1961) was an American teacher, composer and performer of both classical and popular works for the piano.

Andrews was born in Buda, Texas, the son of Jason Lindsey Andrews and Crissie Crawford Andrews. At an early age, the family moved to Kyle, Texas, where he taught mostly the piano to the young ladies, who would perform for their families after dinner in the parlour of their homes.

The Great Depression, and the advent of radio, the phonograph and motion pictures eventually eclipsed parlour music as the preferred after-dinner entertainment. Families no longer invested their income in the musical talents of their children as they once did. To augment his income from music lessons he offered, Fitzhugh became a part-time farmer. He died in Kyle in 1961. His second wife followed him in death the next day.

Some of Fitzhugh's piano compositions are reminiscent of vocal music, lending the score an operatic flair. Tricky passagework and effective rapid runs lend the compositions a quality that is not unlike Liszt transcriptions – at least outwardly.

== Compositions (published) ==
- Visions of Beauty: Reverie. Dallas, TX, 1897.
- Shades of Evening: Reverie. Dallas, TX, 1909.
- The Imperial: March and Two Steps. Dallas, TX, 1909.
