= Mountain City =

Mountain City is the name of several places, mainly in the United States:

- Mountain City, Georgia
- Mountain City, Nevada
- Mountain City, Tennessee
- Mountain City, Texas
- Chongqing, China, nicknamed "Mountain City"

Also:

- Mountain City (novel), a 1930 novel by Upton Sinclair
