= Michaelis Ranch =

- Michaelis, M.G., Ranch
- U.S. National Register of Historic Places
- U.S. Historic district
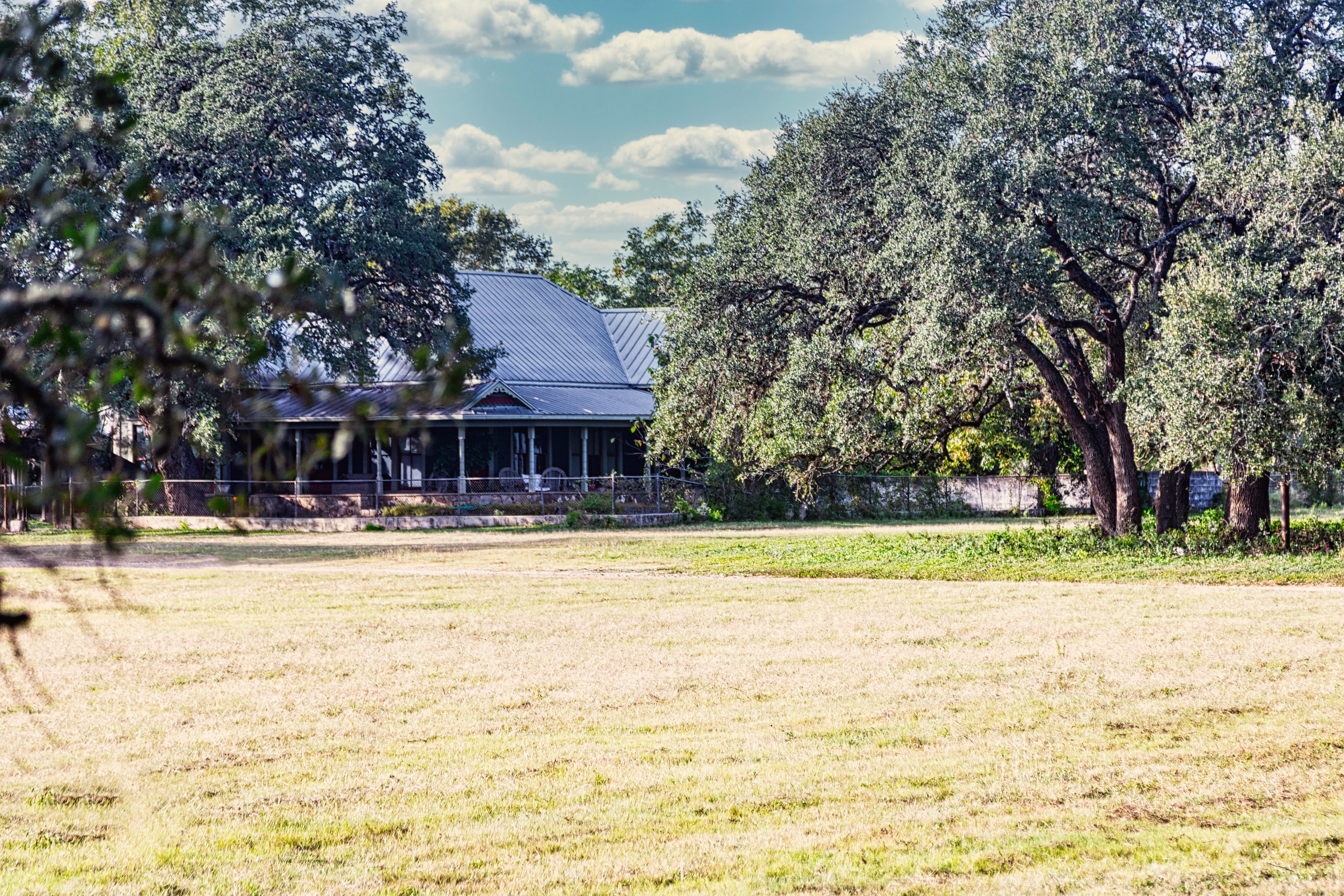

- Location within Texas Location within the United States
- Location: 3600 RM 150 West, Kyle, Texas
- Coordinates: 30°1′42″N 97°55′24″W
- Area: 288 acres (117 ha)
- Built: 1898
- Architectural style: Queen Anne
- MPS: Rural Properties of Hays County, Texas MPS
- NRHP reference No.: 02001212
- Added to NRHP: March 7, 2003

The Michaelis Ranch is a historic cattle ranch located near Kyle, Texas, United States. The ranch was founded by Max G. Michaelis Sr. in the late 1890s, and is listed in the National Register of Historic Places. The ranch was known in the early 20th century as one of the largest producers of donkeys in the United States, and became famous in the 1930s for introducing Charolais cattle to the United States. The ranch was also home to Helen Michaelis, the first woman inducted into the American Quarter Horse Hall of Fame.

== See also ==
- National Register of Historic Places listings in Hays County, Texas
