= Otto Hofmann (disambiguation) =

Otto Hofmann (1896–1982) was a German SS general and Nazi official.

Otto Hofmann may also refer to:

- Otto Hofmann (artist) (1907–1996), German painter
- Otto Jürgen Hofmann (1918–2001), American pipe organ builder

== See also ==
- Otto Hoffman
