= Alex Harkey =

American football player (born 2001)

No. 73 – Los Angeles Chargers
- Position: Offensive tackle
- Roster status: Active

Personal information
- Born: July 22, 2001 (age 25); Austin, Texas, U.S.
- Listed height: 6 ft 6 in (1.98 m)
- Listed weight: 327 lb (148 kg)

Career information
- High school: Hays (Buda, Texas)
- College: Tyler JC (2020–2021); Colorado (2022); Texas State (2023–2024); Oregon (2025)
- NFL draft: 2026: 6th round, 206th overall pick

Career history
- Los Angeles Chargers (2026–present)

Awards and highlights
- Third-team All-Sun Belt (2024)
- Stats at Pro Football Reference

Alex Harkey (born July 22, 2001) is an American professional football offensive tackle for the Los Angeles Chargers of the National Football League (NFL). He played college football for Oregon Ducks and was selected by the Chargers in the sixth round of the 2026 NFL draft.

== Early life ==
Harkey is from Austin, Texas. He attended Jack C. Hays High School in Buda where he played football as a defensive lineman and tight end and basketball. In football, Harkey posted six receptions for 150 yards and three touchdowns as a senior in 2019. He later said that he did not get "serious" about football until his senior season, and as a result he received little attention as a college recruit. He graduated from Hays in 2020 and committed to play college football at the junior college level for the Tyler Apaches after receiving an offer to play there by coach Thomas Rocco.

== College career ==
Harkey's first year at Tyler was in 2020; due to the COVID-19 pandemic, the season did not count towards his future eligibility. During the spring 2021 season, he appeared in four games as a tight end. He then moved to offensive tackle for the fall 2021 season. Harkey transferred to the Colorado Buffaloes in 2022 and played in all 12 games that season, mainly on special teams.

Harkey then transferred to the Texas State Bobcats in 2023. He appeared in four games during the 2023 season. In 2024, he played in all 12 games, helping the Bobcats to a record of 7–5. He was graded by Pro Football Focus as the 12th-best blocking offensive tackle in college football during the 2024 season and was named third-team All-Sun Belt Conference. He transferred to the Oregon Ducks for his final season of college football in 2025. He was invited to the 2026 Senior Bowl.

== Professional career ==
Pre-draft measurables
Height	Weight	Arm length	Hand span	Wingspan	40-yard dash	10-yard split	20-yard split	20-yard shuttle	Three-cone drill	Vertical jump	Broad jump	Bench press
6 ft 5 3/8 in (1.97 m)	313 lb (142 kg)	32 1/2 in (0.83 m)	10 1/4 in (0.26 m)	6 ft 8 1/4 in (2.04 m)	5.24 s	1.79 s	3.03 s	4.90 s	7.69 s	31.0 in (0.79 m)	8 ft 3 in (2.51 m)	21 reps
All values from NFL Combine/Pro Day

Harkey was selected by the Los Angeles Chargers in the sixth round with the 206th overall pick of the 2026 NFL draft.
