= Mountain City, Texas =

- City
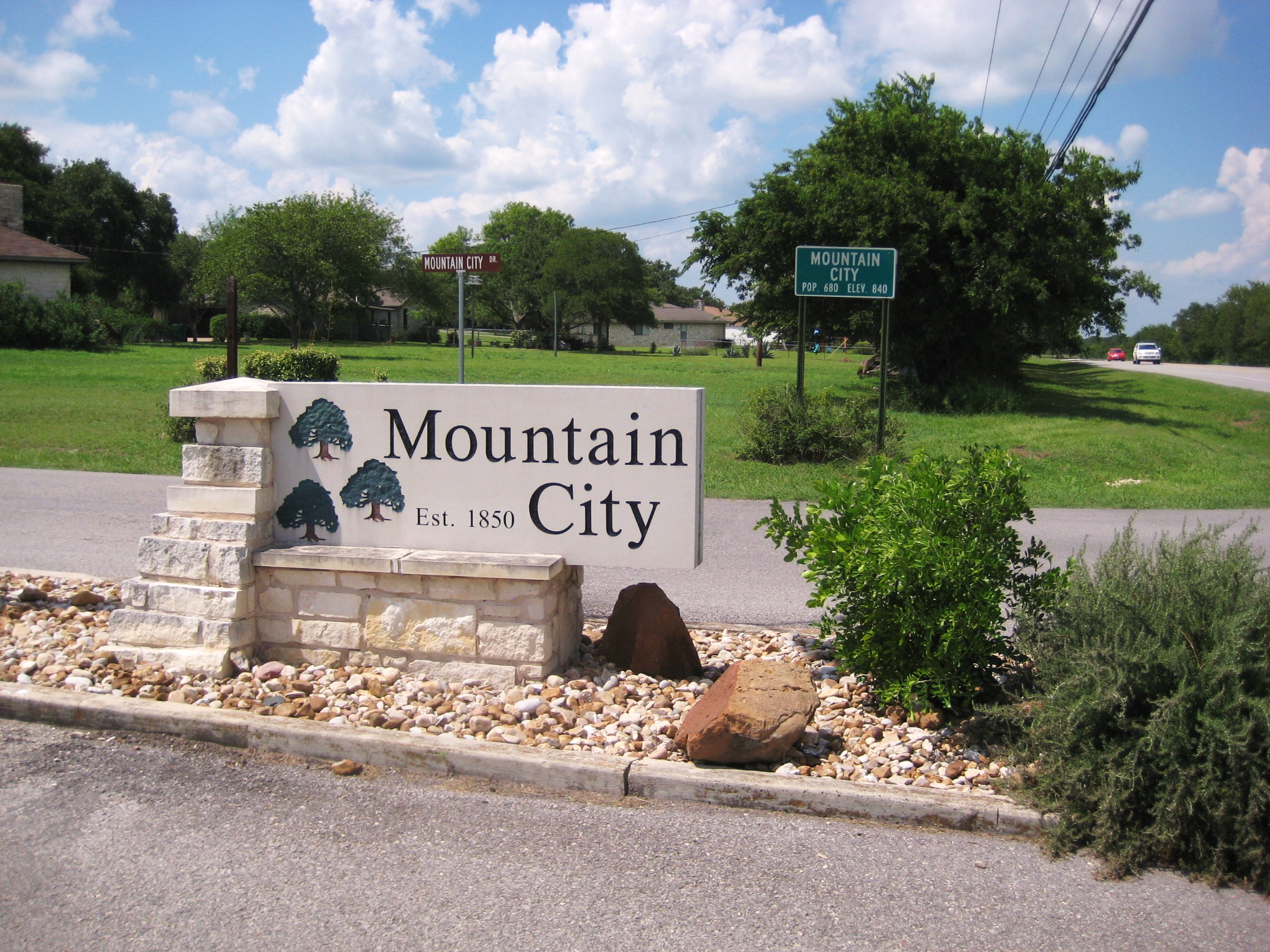
- Entrance to the community of Mountain City.

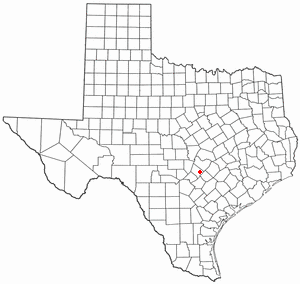
- Location of Mountain City, Texas

- Coordinates: 30°02′21″N 97°53′30″W
- Country: United States
- State: Texas
- County: Hays
- Incorporated: 1984

Area
  - Total: 0.53 sq mi (1.36 km^{2})
  - Land: 0.53 sq mi (1.36 km^{2})
  - Water: 0 sq mi (0.00 km^{2})
- Elevation: 846 ft (258 m)

Population (2020)
  - Total: 622
  - Density: 1,180/sq mi (457/km^{2})
- Time zone: UTC-6 (Central (CST))
  - Summer (DST): UTC-5 (CDT)
- ZIP code: 78610
- Area code: 512
- FIPS code: 48-49600
- GNIS feature ID: 2411184
- Website: https://www.mountaincitytx.gov/

Mountain City is a city in Hays County, Texas, United States. The population was 622 at the 2020 census.

== History ==
From the early 1850s until the 1880s, Mountain City was a sprawling community on the old Stagecoach Road that served as an important hub in the ranching and farming industries of the newly formed Hays County. The original Mountain City was centered near the modern community of the same name, but stretched from the Blanco River around present-day Kyle all the way to Manchaca Springs northeast of present-day Buda.

The first settlers, such as Chattanooga native Phillip Allen and his family, landed in Mountain City around the time of the Texas Revolution in 1835 and 1836. Allen had acquired more than 4,600 acres (19 km^{2}) of land in what would become northern Hays County from Ben Milam's colony grant from the Republic of Texas. But American Indians in the area fought to maintain control of their ancestral lands, driving the settlers away. Allen left to fight against Mexico for Texas independence.

In 1846, after the Texas Rangers had been enlisted to drive out the Indians, Allen and his family successfully settled their land. When Hays County was formed two years later, Allen became one of the first commissioners and was active in local politics until his death in 1860.

Another early family was the Buntons. Tennessee native John Wheeler Bunton moved to Texas in the early 1830s, signed the Texas Declaration of Independence, and served on the first Texas legislature. Just after the Texas Revolution, Bunton returned to Tennessee to marry his sweetheart, and brought back with him a company of 140 settlers for the new frontier. But while traveling by steamer from New Orleans to Texas, their ship was captured by a Mexican man of war and the party was imprisoned in Mexico city for three days.

According to historical lore, Bunton's smooth-talking wife, Mary Howell Bunton, convinced their captors that they were American citizens legally entering Texas under the colonization law granted by Mexico to Stephen F. Austin. After their release, the Buntons continued on to Mountain City, where they built their "Rancho Rambolette" and began to farm and raise a family. Other early settlers included families such as the Vaughans, Bartons, Barbers, Porters, Moores, Rectors and Turners.

The Texas population began to grow rapidly in the 1850s, and Mountain City was no exception. By the 1850s, the small farming and ranching community was starting to thrive, with schools, churches, businesses, mills and gins. In 1855, the community built its first school, Live Oak Academy, with a professor Gibson as the first teacher, followed by John Edgar. The satellite communities of Elm Grove and Science Hall, near the sites of the recently constructed schools by the same names, also had schools and small commercial centers. 1855 also saw the formation of the first house of worship, the Cumberland Presbyterian Church. Baptist and Methodist churches followed in the 1870s. Along with the churches came the Chicago bar, located on the southern end of Mountain City, near the present day location of Wallace Middle School.

Col. W.W. Haupt, who came to Mountain City in 1857, opened a store around the location of the current Hays High School that became home to the Mountain City post office; he also served as postmaster. Two other prominent stores, run by Mr. Schmidt and Mr. Barber, were located about a mile north. The civil war era saw a population boom, and many young men of Mountain City served in the 32nd Cavalry regiment under Col. P.C. Woods and Capt. J.G. Story.

Much like small towns of the 1940s, Mountain City's fate depended on the railroad. The railroad was an upgrade from the stagecoach, bringing mail service, trade, and connections with Austin and San Antonio. State senator Fergus Kyle, living in the Blanco River area south of Mountain City, had the political connections to install tracks, bypassing Mountain City to the east. The Kyle family deeded 200 acres (0.81 km^{2}) to the International-Great Northern Railroad, securing their place in history as founders of a town that would bear their name.

As the fledgling railroad towns of Buda and Kyle sprang to life in the early 1880s, Mountain City quickly dried up. Local schools hung on through the early 1930s as the only hint that the area had once been the regional center of commerce.

In 1990 Mountain City's population was 377, and by the 2000 census, it had risen to 671. Now it's in excess of 700, according to census estimates.

== Geography ==
Mountain City is located between Kyle and Buda, approximately 20 miles (32 km) southwest of Austin.

According to the United States Census Bureau, the city has a total area of 0.5 square mile (1.2 km^{2}), all land.

== Demographics ==
Historical population
Census	Pop.	Note	%±
1990	377		—
2000	671		78.0%
2010	648		−3.4%
2020	622		−4.0%
U.S. Decennial Census; 2020 Census

=== 2020 census ===
As of the 2020 census, Mountain City had a population of 622. The median age was 51.7 years. 18.3% of residents were under the age of 18 and 24.8% of residents were 65 years of age or older. For every 100 females there were 111.6 males, and for every 100 females age 18 and over there were 106.5 males age 18 and over.

100.0% of residents lived in urban areas, while 0.0% lived in rural areas.

There were 232 households in Mountain City, of which 32.8% had children under the age of 18 living in them. Of all households, 80.6% were married-couple households, 7.8% were households with a male householder and no spouse or partner present, and 9.1% were households with a female householder and no spouse or partner present. About 7.7% of all households were made up of individuals and 3.0% had someone living alone who was 65 years of age or older.

There were 232 housing units, of which 0.0% were vacant. The homeowner vacancy rate was 0.0% and the rental vacancy rate was 0.0%.

Racial composition as of the 2020 census
Race	Number	Percent
White	494	79.4%
Black or African American	0	0.0%
American Indian and Alaska Native	2	0.3%
Asian	3	0.5%
Native Hawaiian and Other Pacific Islander	2	0.3%
Some other race	27	4.3%
Two or more races	94	15.1%
Hispanic or Latino (of any race)	150	24.1%

=== 2000 census ===
As of the census of 2000, there were 671 people, 215 households, and 202 families residing in the city. The population density was 1,455.1 inhabitants per square mile (561.8/km^{2}). There were 218 housing units at an average density of 472.7 per square mile (182.5/km^{2}). The racial makeup of the city was 93.29% White, 0.15% African American, 1.49% Native American, 0.75% Asian, 3.13% from other races, and 1.19% from two or more races. Hispanic or Latino of any race were 15.05% of the population.

There were 215 households, out of which 55.8% had children under the age of 18 living with them, 86.5% were married couples living together, 5.6% had a female householder with no husband present, and 6.0% were non-families. 4.7% of all households were made up of individuals, and 0.9% had someone living alone who was 65 years of age or older. The average household size was 3.12 and the average family size was 3.23.

In the city, the population was spread out, with 31.7% under the age of 18, 6.4% from 18 to 24, 28.3% from 25 to 44, 28.8% from 45 to 64, and 4.8% who were 65 years of age or older. The median age was 38 years. For every 100 females, there were 97.4 males. For every 100 females age 18 and over, there were 94.1 males.

The median income for a household in the city was $82,853, and the median income for a family was $84,026. Males had a median income of $58,000 versus $40,357 for females. The per capita income for the city was $28,003. About 2.0% of families and 2.0% of the population were below the poverty line, including 2.4% of those under age 18 and 11.1% of those age 65 or over.

== Education ==
The City of Mountain City is served by the Hays Consolidated Independent School District.
