= Mary Kyle Hartson =

American educator (1865–1956)

Mayor of Kyle, Texas
- In office 1937–1941

Mayor of Kyle, Texas
- In office 1944–1946

Personal details
- Born: Mary Lucy Kyle; December 6, 1865 Hays County, Texas
- Died: March 20, 1956 (aged 90) Wichita Falls, Texas
- Resting place: Kyle, Texas
- Party: Democratic
- Spouse: George Dorr Hartson
- Education: Sam Houston Normal Institute, Huntsville, Texas
- Occupation: teacher, postmistress

Mary Lucy Kyle Hartson (December 6, 1865 – March 20, 1956) was a teacher and postmistress who served two terms as the first woman Mayor of Kyle, Texas.

== Early life ==
Hartson was born Mary Lucy Kyle on December 6, 1865, in Hays County, Texas the daughter of former Confederate captain and future Texas Legislator Fergus Kyle and his wife Anna Elizabeth née Moore. Mary was one of nine children, including Texas A&M administrator, Edwin Jackson Kyle.

Mary Kyle attended Sam Houston Normal Institute in Huntsville, Texas, and began teaching in Taylor, Texas. In 1891 she married George Dorr Hartson. Hartson was killed in an industrial accident in Mexico in 1901, leaving Mary a widow to raise three children. Later that year, through the influence of her cousin, Albert S. Burleson, Hartson was appointed postmistress of Kyle, a position she held until 1925.

== Politics ==
Mrs. Hartson was first elected Mayor of Kyle in 1937 as a 72-year-old great grandmother and resigned in 1941. She was known for hoeing weeds herself around City Hall. In 1943, she ran again and served an additional two years, for a total of six years as mayor. She was an early booster and supporter of Lyndon B. Johnson, who represented her district. During the election of 1940 she stated, "Lyndon is the best man we've ever had in Congress, Cousin Albert notwithstanding." For part of the 1940s, the city council was majority female.

== Death and legacy ==
Hartson suffered a stroke in December 1945 and went to live with her daughter in Wichita Falls, Texas. She died at age 90 on March 20, 1956, in Wichita Falls, and is buried in the Kyle cemetery.

The City of Kyle honored Hartson in an International Women's Day proclamation and also named one of its more significant city parks, Mary Kyle Hartson Park, in her honor.

== See also ==
- Mayor Mary Kyle Hartson in driver's seat of fire truck Digital Image by Neal Douglass, 1940, Portal to Texas History.
- Mrs. Mary Kyle Hartson of Kyle, Texas, Digital Image, 1952, University of Texas at Arlington
