= Garlic Creek =

River in Texas, United States

- Map

Location
- Country: United States
- State: Texas

Physical characteristics
- Mouth: Onion Creek

Garlic Creek is located in northern Hays County near Buda, Texas. Its headwaters are near the intersection of Ranch to Market Road 967 and Farm to Market Road 1626 at 30°06′16″N 97°53′23″W. The stream flows east to northeast crossing into Travis County just before it reaches its confluence with Onion Creek at 30°07′06″N 97°49′27″W approximately 12 miles southwest of Austin.

Garlic Creek was originally named Labinski Branch for one of the first settlers in Hays County, Texas. Victor Labenski built a log cabin on the banks of what is now called Garlic Creek in 1855.

== See also ==
- List of rivers of Texas
