= Edwin Jackson Kyle =

American ambassador (1876–1963)

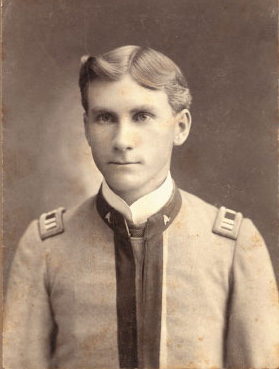

United States Ambassador to Guatemala
- In office May 8, 1945 – August 22, 1948
- President: Harry S. Truman
- Preceded by: Boaz Long
- Succeeded by: Richard C. Patterson, Jr.

Personal details
- Born: July 22, 1876 Kyle, Texas
- Died: December 26, 1963 (aged 87) Bryan, Texas
- Resting place: Bryan City Cemetery; Bryan, Texas; 30.6833°N 96.3657°W
- Spouse: Alice Myers
- Education: Agricultural and Mechanical College of Texas, Cornell University

Edwin Jackson Kyle (July 22, 1876 – December 26, 1963) was the U.S. Ambassador to Guatemala from 1945 to 1948. He was also the first Texan to advocate agricultural teaching in state schools successfully. He is the namesake of Kyle Field, an American football stadium in College Station, Texas, and his parents are the namesake of the suburban town of Kyle, Texas, located fifteen miles south of Austin.

== Early life and education ==
Kyle was born July 22, 1876, in Kyle, Texas, to Captain Fergus Kyle and Anna Moore. His father was a Texas state legislator. Kyle attended various public and private schools before enrolling at the Agricultural and Mechanical College of Texas (now Texas A&M University) in 1896. A high achiever, Kyle became the highest-ranking cadet in his junior class. In his senior year he served as "senior captain," the highest rank in the Corps of Cadets, as well as class president and president of the YMCA. Due to an unexpected vacancy, Kyle became acting commandant for one month, becoming the only student to hold that position. This role also gave him voting privileges in faculty matters, something no other A&M student has been granted.

Kyle graduated with honors in 1899 as class valedictorian before attending Cornell University, where he received a B.S. degree in agriculture in 1901 and an M.S. in 1902. During his time at Cornell, Kyle was a founding member of Cornell's Alpha Zeta fraternity, and "was actively involved in the production of fruits and vegetables for the Pan-American Exposition of 1900." and an honorary doctorate in agriculture from the University of Arkansas in 1949.

== Career ==
=== Texas A&M ===
In 1902, Kyle returned to Texas A&M as an instructor in the horticulture department. He quickly advanced to department head and was granted a full professorship in 1905. When the department became the School of Agriculture in 1911, Kyle was named its first dean. Committed to education as well as research, Kyle wrote prolifically about agriculture. His book, Fundamentals of Farming and Farm Life, was adopted by the state of Texas as a standard elementary textbook in 1912. Within 30 years this textbook had sold over half a million copies, "an enormous publication run for the era."

In the fall of 1904, Kyle, who was also the director of the General Athletics Association, wanted to secure and develop an athletic field to promote the school's athletics. Texas A&M was unwilling to provide funds, so Kyle fenced off a section of the southeast corner of campus that had been assigned to him for agricultural use. Using $650 of his own money, he purchased the covered grandstand from the Bryan fairgrounds and built wooden bleachers to raise the seating capacity to 500 people. The students unofficially named the athletic field Kyle Field in his honor in 1908. Although Kyle resigned as head of the General Athletics Association when he became a dean, he remained involved with the improvements to the athletic field for many years.

In 1941, Kyle toured Central and South America on behalf of the Office of the Coordinator of Inter-American Affairs to study the agriculture economy. The following year the Texas Department of Agriculture appointed him as an official delegate to the second Inter-American Conference on Agriculture in Mexico.

=== Government work ===
Kyle retired from Texas A&M in 1944. For a brief period following his retirement, he served as the Director of the Farm Credit Administration at Houston. In January 1945 he was selected by U.S. President Franklin D. Roosevelt to be the American ambassador to Guatemala. Following his resignation in 1947, Guatemala awarded him the Order of the Quetzal, making him at the time the only American honored with the award.

== Later years ==
In 1948, Kyle returned to Bryan, Texas, where he lived for the rest of his life. He died at his home on December 26, 1963.

Diplomatic posts
Preceded by Boaz Long	United States Ambassador to Guatemala; May 8, 1945–August 22, 1948	Succeeded by Richard C. Patterson, Jr.
