= Lehman High School (Texas) =

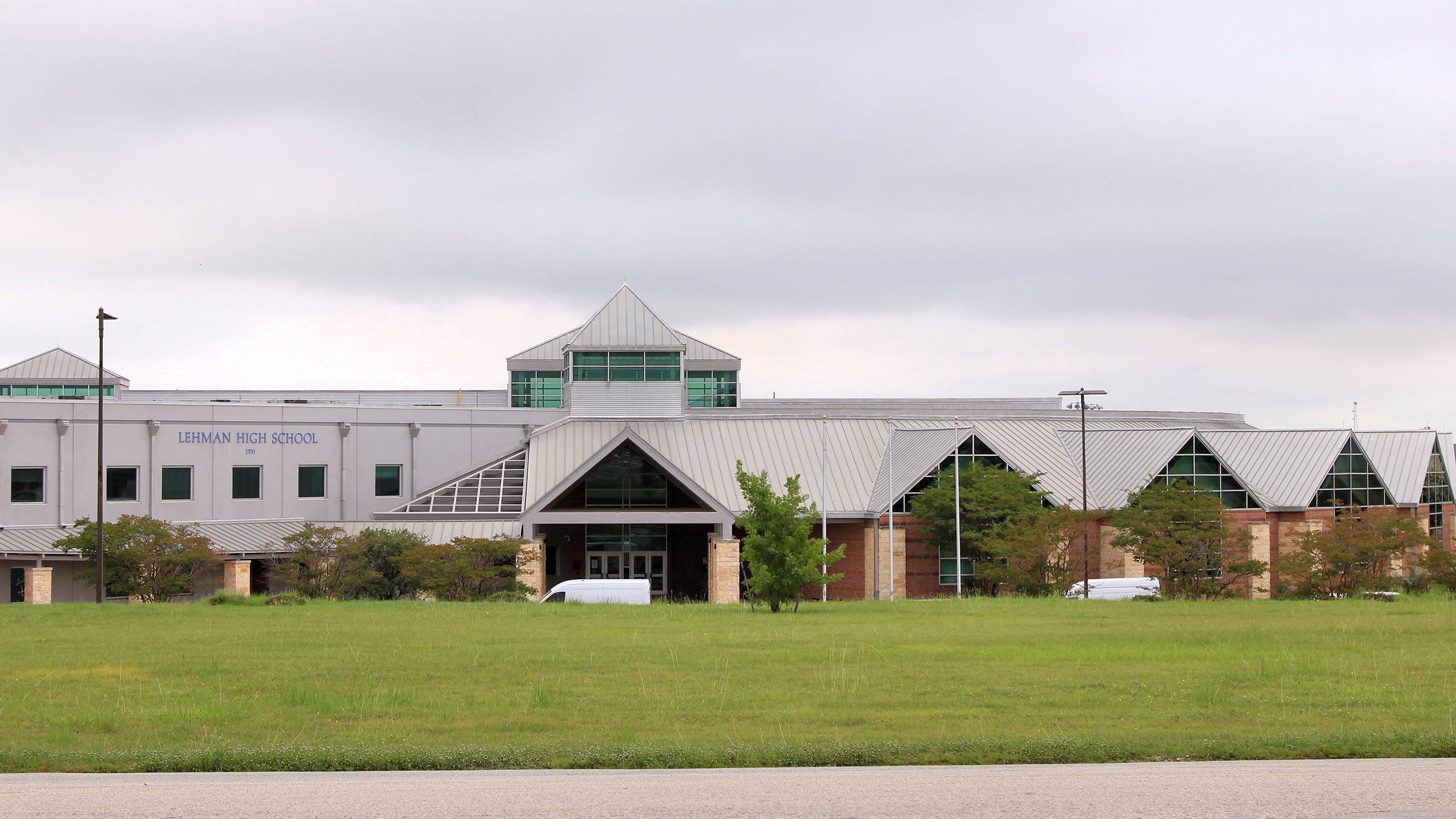

Location
- 1700 Lehman Road; Kyle, Texas 78640; United States; 29.99525°N 97.84794°W

Information
- Motto: Achieving excellence as one with integrity, wisdom and pride
- Established: 2004
- School district: Hays Consolidated Independent School District
- Superintendent: Dr. Eric Wright
- Principal: James Cruz
- Teaching staff: 124.9
- Grades: 9–12
- Enrollment: 2,184 (2025–2026)
- Student to teacher ratio: 16.9
- Colors: Royal Blue & Silver
- Athletics conference: UIL Class 5A
- Mascot: Lobo
- Rival: Hays High School
- Website: Lehman High School

Lehman High School is a public high school located in Kyle, Texas, United States and classified as a 5A high school by the University Interscholastic League (UIL). It is a part of Hays Consolidated Independent School District, located in east central Hays County. It was established in 2004 and is named after the family of Ted Lehman, a former Hays CISD School Board President, who also donated a parcel of land where the school is located. In 2015, the school was rated "Met Standard" by the Texas Education Agency.

== History ==
As the student population of Jack C. Hays High School swelled to over 2,400, the need for second high school in Hays CISD became apparent. In August 2004, the Lehman High School campus opened its doors with 960 students in grades 8 through 10. The school has had four principals since opening.

== Athletic program ==
The Lehman Lobos compete in Volleyball, Cross Country, Football, Basketball, Powerlifting, Swimming, Soccer, Golf, Tennis, Track, Baseball & Softball, and Mountain Biking.

== NJROTC ==
The Lehman High School NJROTC contains Marksmanship, Academic, PT, and Armed and Unarmed drill teams. In 2013 and 2015 Lehman NJROTC qualified for state and competed at Texas A&M and their highest place was Armed exhibition of 5th place.
