= Ari Rastegar =

American real estate investor

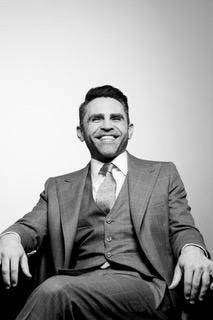
- Born: Ariah-Hossein Rastegar; April 6, 1982 (age 44); Austin, Texas
- Occupation: CEO of Rastegar Property Company

Ari Rastegar is an American real estate investor and CEO of Rastegar Property Company in Austin, Texas.

== Early life and education ==
Rastegar was born in Austin in 1982 to an Iranian father and German mother. He grew up in Dallas, Texas. He received an undergraduate degree from Texas A&M University and then attended law school at St. Mary’s University.

== Career ==
In 2006, while attending law school, Rastegar began investing in real estate. After graduation, he began working for John Read, an attorney in Dallas. In 2010 he met New York investor Anthony Orso, who moved Rastegar to New York and funded his event hosting venture, Capital A Entertainment. He began investing in properties in the Austin area in 2012.

Rastegar returned to Texas in 2015 and founded Rastegar Capital, a private real estate investment firm headquartered in Austin. He is also the company's CEO. (Rastegar Capital rebranded as Rastegar Equity Partners in 2018, and later as Rastegar Property Company.) By January 2017, Rastegar's firm had $500 million in assets under management. As part of his work with the company, Rastegar led planning to construct the world's tallest living wall, announced in April 2020 as part of a development at 1899 McKinney in Dallas. He invests across commercial real estate product types.

Rastegar authored the book The Gift of Failure, published in July 2022.

== Personal life ==
Rastegar is married to Kellie Rastegar. He has three children. He identifies as a biohacker. He takes roughly 150 vitamins and supplements each day, sleeps on a temperature-regulated bed, and routinely uses hyperbaric chambers and infrared light beds with the goal of maximizing his productivity.
