= Fergus Kyle =

American farmer (1834–1906)

Texas State Representative for District 28
- In office February 9, 1870 – January 14, 1873

Texas State Representative from District 98
- In office January 8, 1901 – January 13, 1903

Texas State Representative from District 90
- In office January 13, 1903 – May 19, 1906

Personal details
- Born: September 6, 1834 Hinds County, Mississippi, US
- Died: May 19, 1906 (aged 71)
- Resting place: Kyle, Texas, US
- Party: Democratic
- Spouse: Anna Elizabeth Moore
- Children: Edwin Jackson, Mary Lucy
- Occupation: farming

Fergus Kyle (September 6, 1834 – May 19, 1906) was a farmer, former Confederate Captain, and Democratic politician who served three terms in the Texas Legislature.

Fergus Kyle was born in Hinds County, Mississippi in 1834 the son of Claiborne Kyle and Lucy née Bugg. Kyle moved to Hays County, Texas around 1850. He was educated at Thrall's Academy in Austin, Texas, and in 1860 he married Anna Elizabeth Moore. During the Civil War, he enlisted in the 8th Texas Cavalry Regiment (Confederate States Army), popularly known as Terry's Texas Rangers, and was later promoted to captain following his involvement at the Battle of Shiloh. After the war he returned to Hays County and began farming and raising stock.

He was elected to the Texas House of Representatives, representing District 28 at the 12th Texas Legislature from 1870 to 1871. Kyle was re-elected in 1881, representing District 98 at the 17th Texas Legislature and was appointed Sergeant at Arms for the Texas Senate, serving until 1884. He returned to the House of Representatives, as the representative for District 90 in 1903, where he co-sponsored the 1905 Alamo purchase bill. He died, whilst still in office, on May 19, 1906, at the age of 71. He is buried in the Kyle cemetery.

Kyle, Texas was named after Kyle and his wife, after his family ceded the land to the International–Great Northern Railroad for the railway between Austin to San Marcos. They had nine children, including Texas A&M professor and administrator Edwin Jackson Kyle, and mayor of Kyle, Mary Lucy Kyle Hartson.
