= Jack C. Hays High School =

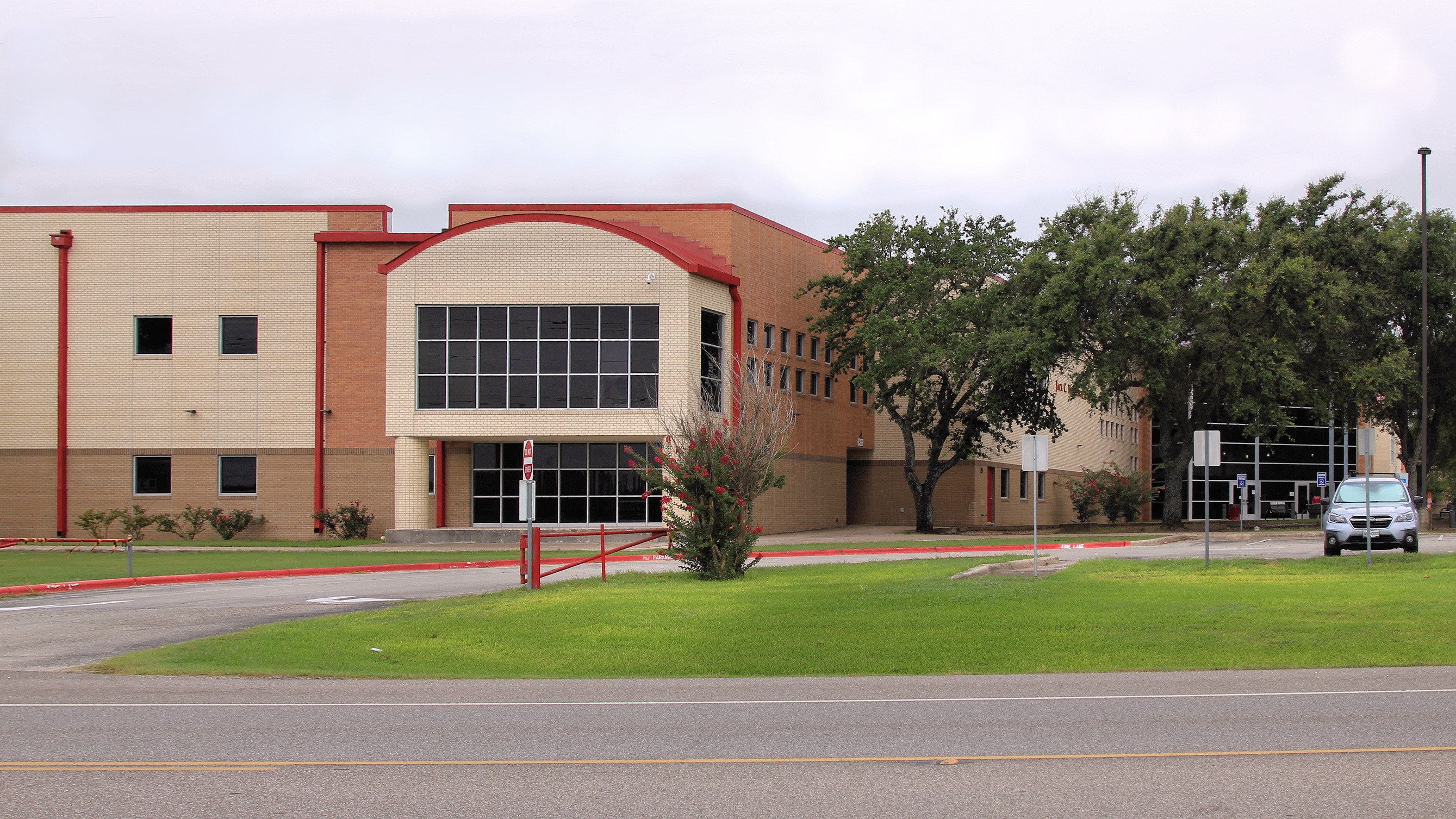

Location
- 4800 Jack C Hays Trail; Buda, Texas 78610; United States; 30.030790°N 97.888710°W

Information
- School type: High School
- Motto: Have a great, great Hays High School day! Re. 2021 'Have a great, great Hays High School day!!'
- Established: 1968; 58 years ago
- School district: Hays Consolidated Independent School District
- Superintendent: Eric Wright
- NCES School ID: 480001005244
- Principal: Joe Mitchell
- Teaching staff: 133.50 (on an FTE basis)
- Grades: 9-12
- Enrollment: 2,334 (2025–2026)
- Student to teacher ratio: 16.41
- Colors: Red, white, and blue
- Athletics conference: UIL Class 6A
- Mascot: Hawk
- Website: www.hayscisd.net/o/hhs

Jack C. Hays High School is a public high school located in Hays County, Texas USA and classified as a 6A high school by the University Interscholastic League as of 2026. Hays High School is the oldest existing high school in Hays CISD, but was thoroughly renovated in the early 2000s. In 2015, the school was rated "Met Standard" by the Texas Education Agency.

== History ==
The school is named for John Coffee Hays, a frontier defender, Texas Ranger and hero to those he fought to protect. He achieved fame after leaving Texas in 1849 for California, where he became the first elected sheriff of San Francisco and helped found the city of Oakland. Hays High School was formed by the consolidation of Buda, Kyle and Wimberley high schools in 1968. In 1986, the Wimberley community was released from the Hays Consolidated School District and reformed Wimberley High School. A further split occurred with the opening of Lehman High School in neighboring Kyle in the fall of 2004.

== Mascot ==
The school mascot was a Yosemite Sam-like character dressed in the standard gray uniform of the Army of the Confederate States of America known as "Colonel Jack". While "Colonel Jack" formerly wielded dual revolvers with a Rebel flag belt buckle, a Texas flag in his left hand, and a white flag bearing an H in his right. As with other institutions which draw upon confederate imagery, Hays High School encountered controversy on and off for years before ultimately discarding the rebel flag as an official symbol in 2000 and banning it from official functions entirely in 2012, followed by retiring Dixie as a fight song in 2015 and replacing it with the school's original fight song, On, Wisconsin!.

The Rebel mascot was retired following the 2020–21 school year, with the Hawk being chosen as the new mascot beginning with the 2021–22 school year. The colors remain unchanged.

== Athletics ==
Hays High School's Stadium, Bob Shelton stadium is named after legendary Hays High School football coach Bob Shelton, who, until his retirement in 2010, was the only head coach ever for the Rebels. He began coaching at Hays High School when it formed in 1968 and was head coach at Buda High School for four years prior to that. At the time of his retirement, he was the longest tenured high school football coach at the same school in Texas.

Hays High School competes in the following sports –

Cross Country, Volleyball, Football, Basketball, Powerlifting, Swimming, Soccer, Golf, Tennis, Track, Baseball and Softball

=== State Titles ===
- Volleyball -
  - 1968(B)
- Softball -
  - 2013(4A)

== Notable alumni ==
- Alex Harkey, college football offensive tackle for the Oregon Ducks
- Donnie Joseph, Major League Baseball pitcher
- Dillon Passage, Tiger King star Joe Exotic's recent husband
- James Rossi, Navy Football team captain 2006
