= Helen Michaelis =

American Quarter Horse trainer

- Born: 7 February 1905; Junction, Texas, United States
- Died: 26 July 1965; Kyle, Texas, United States
- Occupations: Rancher, horse breeder and trainer
- Known for: Secretary-treasurer of the American Quarter Horse Association, pioneering female horse breeder and trainer, American Quarter Horse Hall of Fame inductee
- Spouse: Max G. Michaelis Jr.
- Children: Max G. Michaelis III
- Parent(s): Frederic Savignac Hall (1864–1946) and Florence Black (1879–?)

Helen Michaelis (February 7, 1905, Junction, Texas USA – July 26, 1965, Kyle, Texas USA) was a key figure in the organization and development of the modern Quarter Horse. She was the secretary-treasurer of the American Quarter Horse Association (AQHA) from March 1942 to August 1946, and was the first woman inducted into the American Quarter Horse Hall of Fame.

== Life and family ==
Helen Mary Hall, daughter of Fred S. Hall (1864–1946) and Florence Black (b1879), was born on a ranch in Kimble County, Texas. Her father, Fred S. Hall, had come to Texas from England to raise horses. Besides Helen, her parents had three boys, all younger than she. In 1917, the family moved to a larger ranch in Concho County, Texas, near Eden.

Hall attended college at the University of Texas, and spent the summer of 1928 teaching riding at Camp Ekalela near Estes Park in Colorado. When she returned to Texas, she rounded up a string of horses she had raised and trained on the family ranch, and drove them from Eden to Austin. She first rented at the Westenfield Riding Club, and later bought her own riding academy. In 1932, she married Max G Michaelis Jr., sold her stables and most of her horses, and moved to Mexico with him. Hall stayed active in the livestock business after marrying Michaelis, and continued to raise and train horses in Mexico. They later moved back to the Michaelis Ranch in Kyle, Texas. Hall died on July 26, 1965, at St. David's Hospital in Austin, Texas, and she is buried at Kyle Cemetery in Kyle, Texas.

== American Quarter Horse Association ==
As an expert on Texas horses, Helen was one of the founders of the American Quarter Horse Association (AQHA) in the mid-1930s. She met some initial resistance and prejudice as a woman in the livestock industry, but ultimately gained the respect of her peers. She was elected as a director of the AQHA in 1940, and held the position of secretary-treasurer from March 1942 to August 1946. She was inducted into the American Quarter Horse Hall of Fame in 1985.
