= Kyle, Texas =

City in Texas, United States

- City
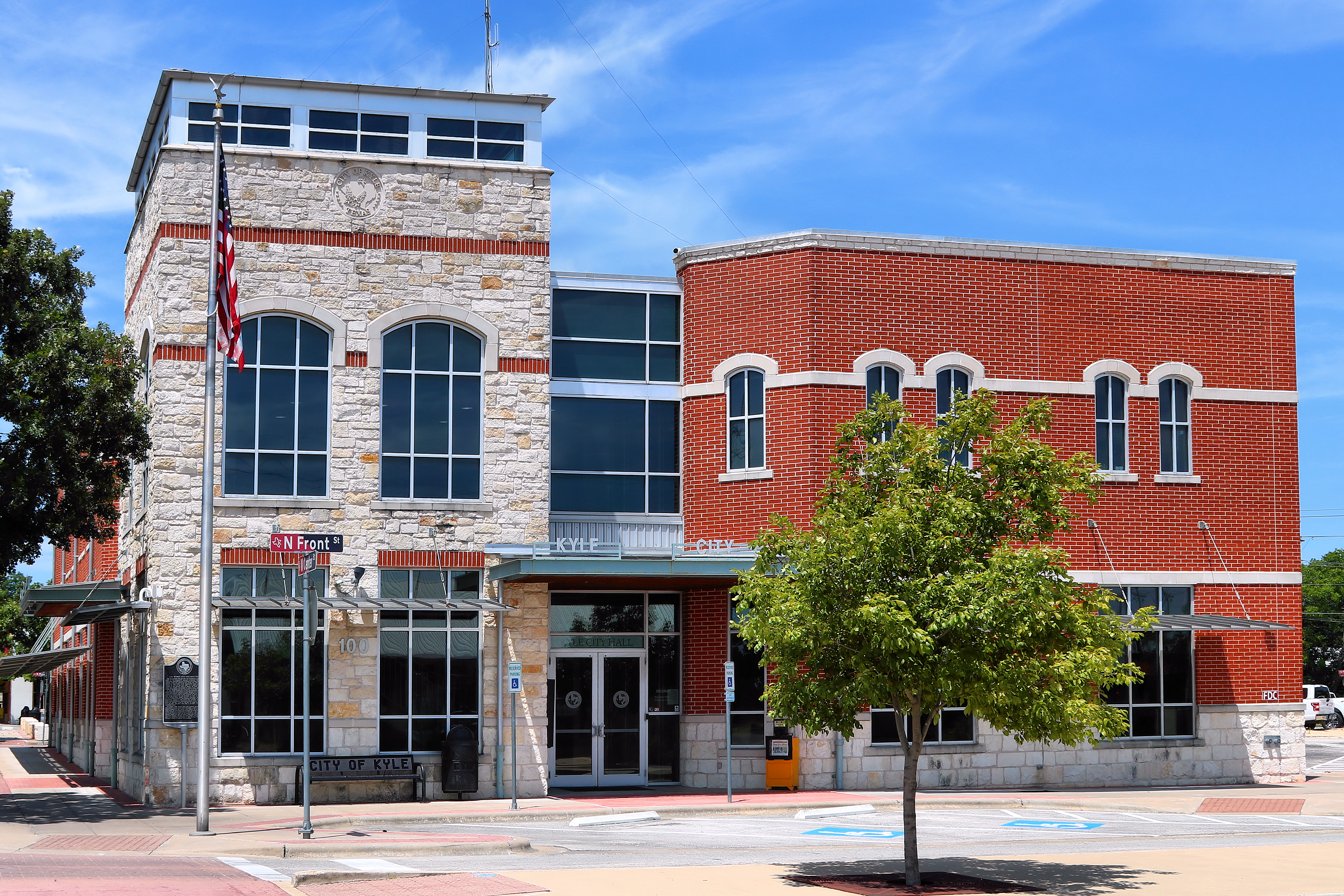
- Kyle City Hall
- Nickname: Pie Capital of Texas
- Location of Kyle, Texas
- Coordinates: 29°59′21″N 97°52′33″W
- Country: United States
- State: Texas
- County: Hays
- Incorporated: 1928
- Named for: Fergus Kyle

Government
  - Type: Council–manager government

Area
  - Total: 31.27 sq mi (80.99 km^{2})
  - Land: 31.07 sq mi (80.48 km^{2})
  - Water: 0.20 sq mi (0.51 km^{2})
- Elevation: 728 ft (222 m)

Population (2020)
  - Total: 45,697
  - Density: 1,471/sq mi (567.8/km^{2})
- Demonym: Kyleite
- Time zone: UTC−6 (Central (CST))
  - Summer (DST): UTC−5 (CDT)
- ZIP Code: 78640
- Area code(s): 512 & 737
- FIPS code: 48-39952
- GNIS feature ID: 2411564
- Website: www.cityofkyle.gov

Kyle is a city in Hays County, Texas, United States. Its population grew from 28,016 in 2010 to 45,697 in 2020, making it one of Texas' fastest-growing cities. It is part of the Greater Austin area.

== History ==
As part of railroad expansion along the International-Great Northern Railroad (I&GN), railroad tycoon and entrepreneur Jay Gould found an opportunity for additional revenue between the cities of Austin and San Marcos which were lined with cotton fields and livestock farms. Originally, the railline was to cross over to Mountain City, located three miles (4.8 km) north of Kyle, but when addressing with his secretary, Ira Evans, it was seen as more cost effective to build a straight track from Austin to San Marcos which went right through the private lands of Fergus Kyle and his wife, Anne Moore. Following an agreement between the I&GN and the Kyle and Moore families, 200 acres were deeded to the railroad in exchange for $1.

The rights to the track through Kyle was then sold to the Texas Land Company, which would be in charge of plotting the town, who then sent a surveying party and filed plans with the county clerk for the town on September 7, 1880. The town originally consisted only of 6x3 city blocks for both commercial and residential zoning, as well as a combination train depot and separate cotton platform along the tracks. The first lots were sold at an auction on September 25 under the now historically designated 'Auction Oak' with the railroad offering free rides and food for attendees from Austin.

The new town drew residents and businesses from Mountain City and Blanco, four miles (6.4 km) west, as well as independent farmers and ranchers in the county. Tom Martin operated the first business in Kyle as a saloon-meat market combination, the first of four saloons to open in the town's inaugural year. Other founding families like the Nance and Wallace families would open a cotton gin and lumberyard not long after, and by 1883 the population exceeded 500, growing to over 700 by the first census the town participate in, but would later decline during the Great Depression and ensuing Dust Bowl.

Kyle was incorporated in 1928 as a general-law city with a mayor and five council members. In 1937, Mary Kyle Hartson, daughter of Fergus Kyle, was elected mayor by a write-in vote. Hartson, after winning election again in 1944, would serve as mayor as part of an all-woman city council and making Kyle the only Texas town with an all-woman government.

From 1892 to 1901, Kyle was the childhood home of Pulitzer Prize–winning author Katherine Anne Porter. Many of her most famous stories, such as "Noon Wine," are set in locations in and around Kyle. Her former home is now a writer's residence open to the public by appointment. The Katherine Anne Porter Literary Center hosts readings by visiting writers.

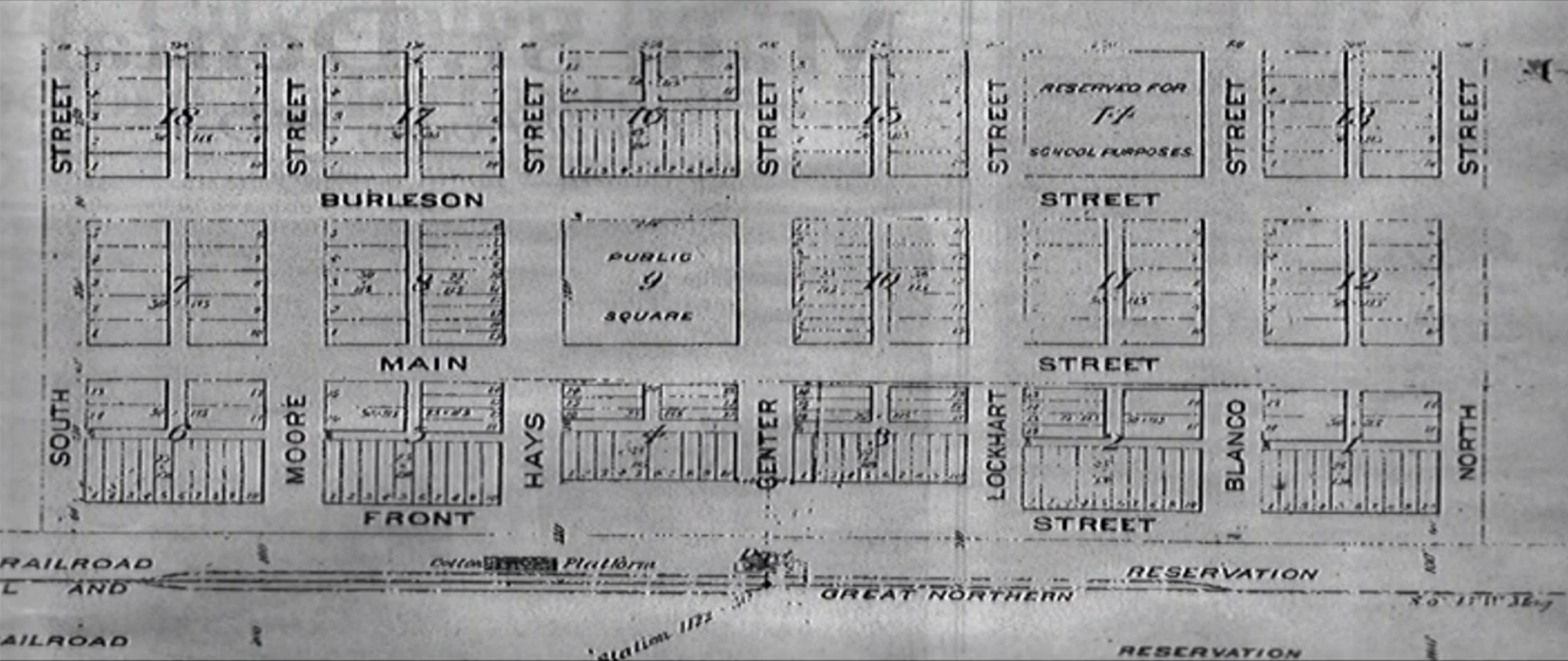
Kyle Townsite Plat of 1880

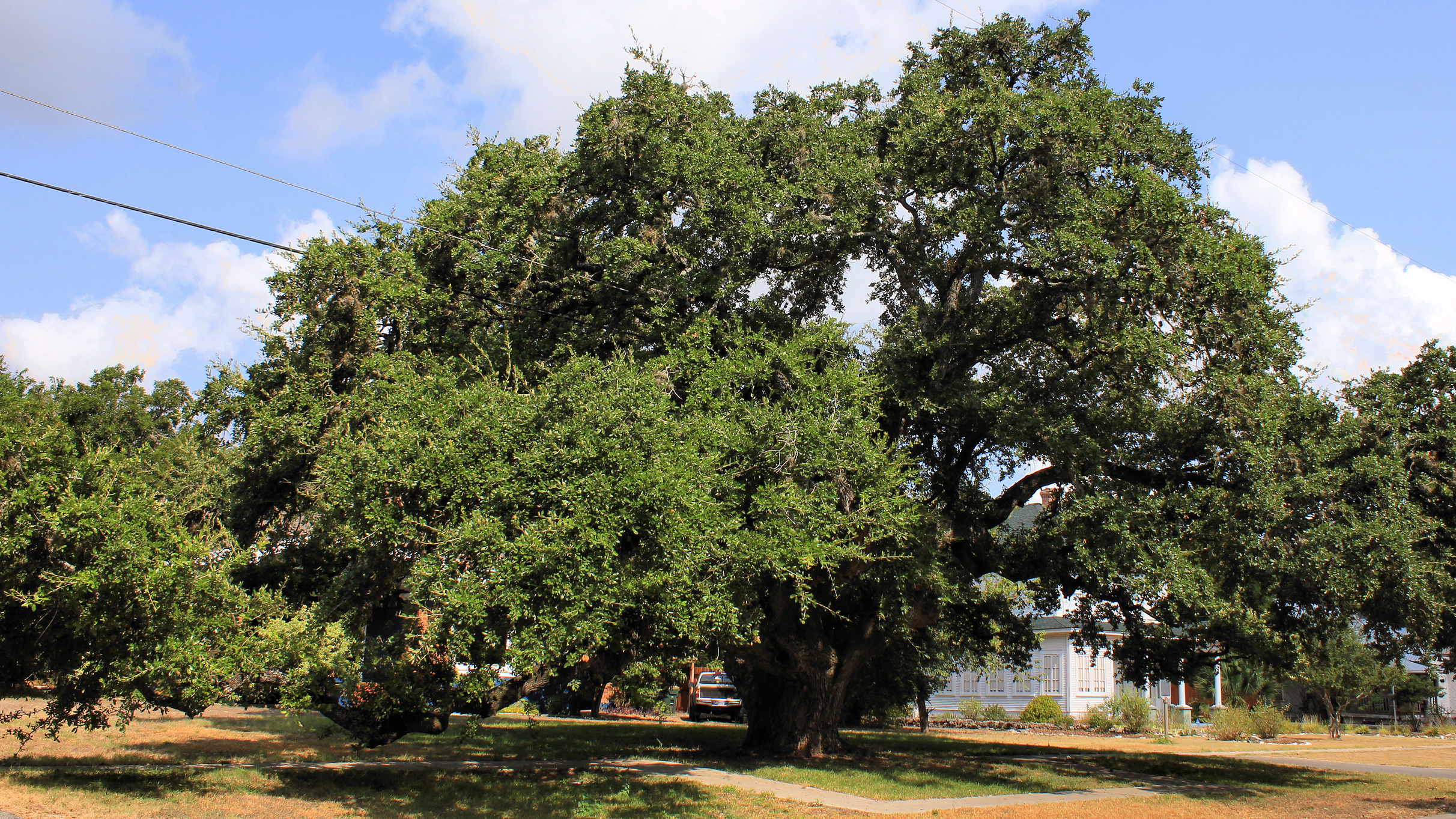
Auction Oak

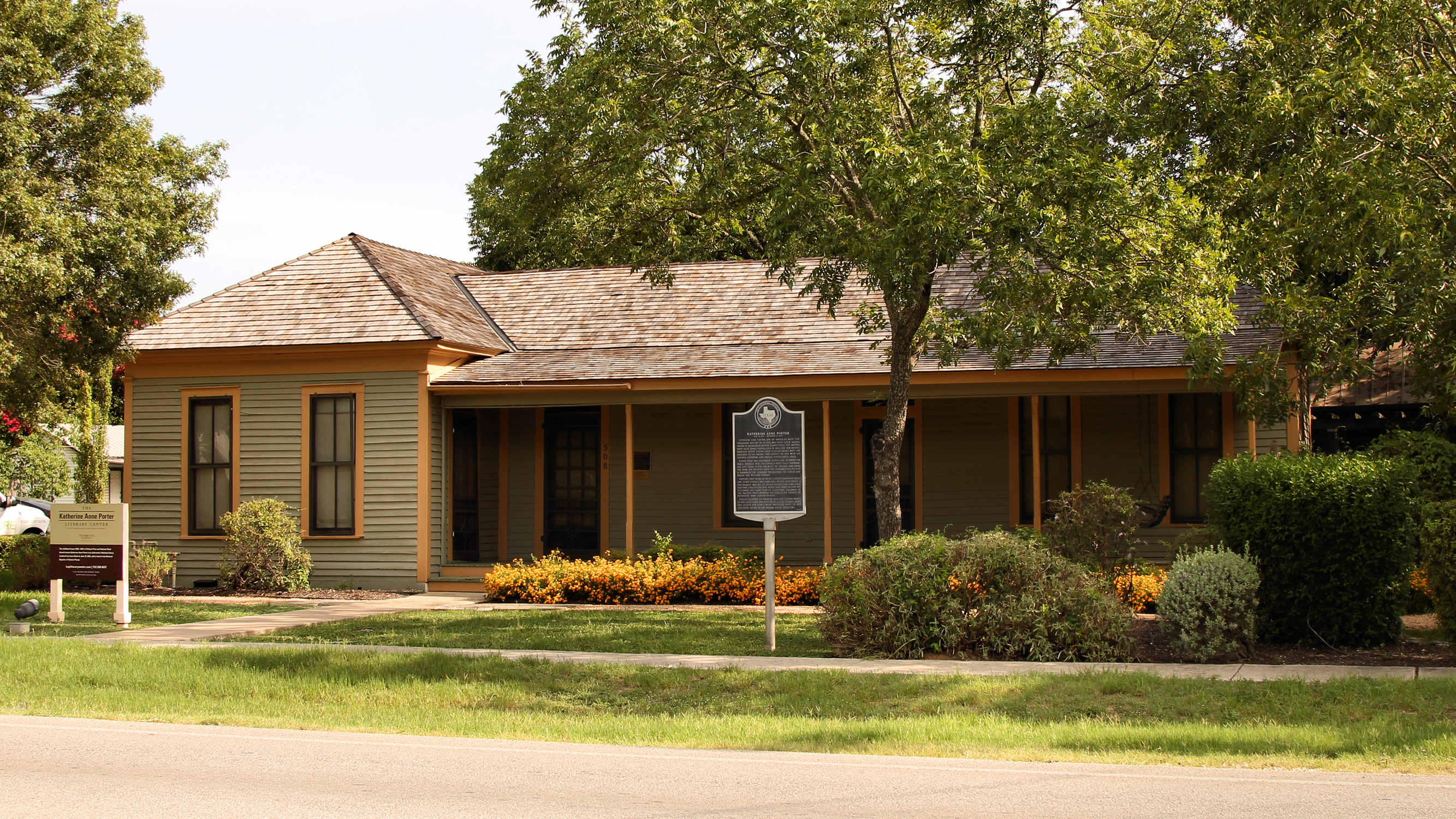
The Katherine Anne Porter Literary Center

== Geography ==
Kyle is in eastern Hays County and is bordered to the south by San Marcos and to the northwest by Mountain City. Kyle is 22 mi (35 km) southwest of downtown Austin and 58 mi (93 km) northeast of San Antonio on Interstate 35.

According to the United States Census Bureau, the city has an area of 19.3 square miles (50.0 km^{2}), of which 19.1 sq mi (49.4 km^{2}) is land and 0.2 sq mi (0.5 km^{2}), 1.06%, is covered by water. The Blanco River runs through the western side of the city, while the central and eastern parts of the city drain east to Plum Creek. Both waterways are tributaries of the San Marcos River.

== Demographics ==
Historical population
Census	Pop.	Note	%±
1890	779		—
1910	742		—
1920	744		0.3%
1930	606		−18.5%
1940	874		44.2%
1950	888		1.6%
1960	1,023		15.2%
1970	1,629		59.2%
1980	2,093		28.5%
1990	2,225		6.3%
2000	5,314		138.8%
2010	28,016		427.2%
2020	45,697		63.1%
2025 (est.)	69,917		53.0%
U.S. Decennial Census; 1850–1900 1910; 1920 1930 1940; 1950 1960 1970; 1980 1990 2000; 2010 2020

=== Racial and ethnic composition ===
Kyle city, Texas – Racial and ethnic composition Note: the US Census treats Hispanic/Latino as an ethnic category. This table excludes Latinos from the racial categories and assigns them to a separate category. Hispanics/Latinos may be of any race.
Race / Ethnicity (NH = Non-Hispanic)	Pop 2000	Pop 2010	Pop 2020	% 2000	% 2010	% 2020
White alone (NH)	2,012	12,733	18,374	37.86%	45.45%	40.21%
Black or African American alone (NH)	427	1,428	2,265	8.04%	5.10%	4.96%
Native American or Alaska Native alone (NH)	17	86	124	0.32%	0.31%	0.27%
Asian alone (NH)	17	286	742	0.32%	1.02%	1.62%
Native Hawaiian or Pacific Islander alone (NH)	0	10	33	0.00%	0.04%	0.07%
Other race alone (NH)	7	64	211	0.13%	0.23%	0.46%
Mixed race or Multiracial (NH)	54	430	1,588	1.02%	1.53%	3.48%
Hispanic or Latino (any race)	2,780	12,979	22,360	52.31%	46.33%	48.93%
Total	5,314	28,016	45,697	100.00%	100.00%	100.00%

=== 2020 census ===
As of the 2020 census, there were 45,697 people, 15,590 households, and 10,370 families residing in the city. The median age was 32.6 years, with 27.0% of residents under the age of 18 and 8.5% of residents 65 years of age or older. For every 100 females there were 96.8 males, and for every 100 females age 18 and over there were 95.4 males.

Of the 15,590 households, 42.2% had children under the age of 18 living in them, 50.1% were married-couple households, 15.9% were households with a male householder and no spouse or partner present, and 24.3% were households with a female householder and no spouse or partner present. About 20.4% of households were made up of individuals and 5.7% had someone living alone who was 65 years of age or older. The average household size was 3.15, the average family size was 3.51, and 391 persons in the city lived in group quarters rather than households.

98.1% of residents lived in urban areas, while 1.9% lived in rural areas.

There were 16,368 housing units, of which 4.8% were vacant. The homeowner vacancy rate was 1.8% and the rental vacancy rate was 7.2%.

Racial composition as of the 2020 census
Race	Number	Percent
White	24,425	53.4%
Black or African American	2,471	5.4%
American Indian and Alaska Native	450	1.0%
Asian	809	1.8%
Native Hawaiian and Other Pacific Islander	40	0.1%
Some other race	6,818	14.9%
Two or more races	10,684	23.4%
Hispanic or Latino (of any race)	22,360	48.9%

=== 2012–2016 American Community Survey ===
For 2012–2016, the estimated median annual income for a household was $72,191, and for a family was $76,992. Male full-time workers had a median income of $50,235 versus $39,474 for females. The per capita income for the town was $25,348. About 6.8% of the population and 5.4% of families were below the poverty line; 7.3% of the population under the age of 18 and 7.7% of those 65 or older were living in poverty.

== Education ==
The longest-active school building in Kyle was built in 1939 as part of the then-Kyle Independent School District, later named Kyle High School and today known as Kyle Elementary School following the construction of Jack C. Hays High School in 1964, named after the same Jack C. Hays that gives the school district, now Hays Consolidated Independent School District, its namesake. High-school students have since attended either Jack C. Hays High School, Lehman High School (since opening in 2004), or Johnson High School located in neighboring Buda (opened in 2019).

In higher education, Kyle sits just seven miles (11 km) north of Texas State University located in San Marcos and is home to the Hays campus of the Austin Community College District which has been fully operational since 2014 with the college district's Public Safety Training Center opening a few years afterward.

== Transportation ==
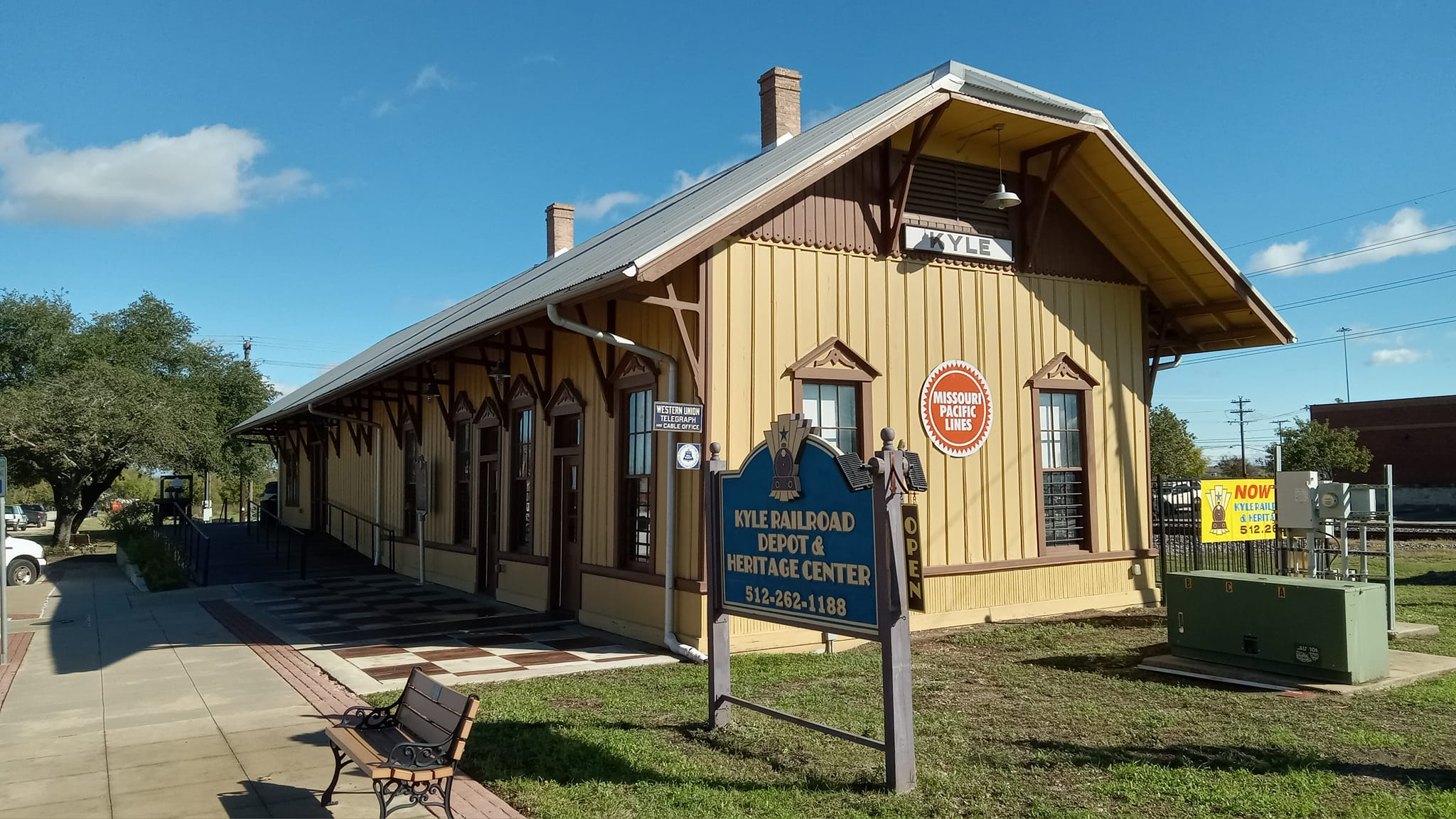
Historic Kyle Railroad Depot

Austin–Bergstrom International Airport is 25 mi (40 km) northeast of Kyle, San Marcos Regional Airport is 10 mi (16 km) to the south, and San Antonio International Airport is 53 mi (85 km) to the southwest.

The MoPac rail line runs through downtown Kyle but currently there is no stop in Kyle. The Amtrak Texas Eagle passenger rail line has a stop located 10 mi (16 km) south of Kyle in San Marcos.

Residents have access to I-35, SH 45 toll road, FM 150, FM 1626, SH 21, and SH 123.

The Kyle city council in September 2021 approved of a citywide trail system known as The Vybe to connect city residents with a mix of dirt, crushed granite, and paved trails along with existing roadways and trails.

=== Highways ===
- I-35: Connects northbound to Buda and Austin; southbound to San Marcos, New Braunfels, and San Antonio
- RM 150: Connects to Driftwood and Dripping Springs to the northwest and Uhland to the southeast
- FM 1626: Connects to the outer parts of Buda, Hays, and Manchaca

== Government and infrastructure ==
The city of Kyle is governed by a council-manager form of government. The city council consists of three members representing geographical districts, three at-large council members, and the mayor, who is also elected at-large. Each council member is elected to three-year terms.

=== State and federal representation ===
The Management and Training Corporation operates the Kyle Unit, a prison for men in Kyle, on behalf of the Texas Department of Criminal Justice. In 1988, the construction of Kyle Unit, the first private prison for the TDCJ, sparked controversy. The Kyle Unit became the second-largest employer in Kyle, after the Hays Consolidated Independent School District. In 1989, the prison had a $50,000 weekly payroll, with much of it going to the city's residents.

The United States Postal Service operates the Kyle Post Office.

== Pie in the Sky Hot Air Balloon Festival ==
As part of a municipal branding scheme in the chase of becoming the "Pie Capital of Texas," the Kyle Pie in the Sky Hot Air Balloon Festival has been an annual event in Kyle on Labor Day weekend since 2017. The event features morning hot air balloon "mass ascensions” where balloons take off at sunrise flying over Kyle on Saturday and Sunday morning, as well as “glows” in the evenings, where tethered hot air balloons glow against the evening sky at Lake Kyle.

Kyle achieved its goal on June 8, 2021, when Kyle was officially designated as the "Pie Capital of Texas." However, the Kyle City Council voted to discontinue the annual Pie in the Sky festival in 2024 due to budget constraints and that the event is unreliable due to its weather dependency.

== Notable people ==
- Fitzhugh Andrews, composer
- Gary Clark Jr., musician
- I. B. Donalson, USAF officer and flying ace
- Roberto Garza, former American football center
- Otto Hofmann, organ builder
- Kaylee Hottle, actress (Godzilla X Kong)
- Cecil "Tex" Hughson, all-star baseball pitcher for the Boston Red Sox
- Edwin Jackson Kyle, U.S. Ambassador to Guatemala (1945–48), namesake of Kyle Field
- Helen Michaelis, expert on Quarter Horses, first woman inducted into the American Quarter Horse Hall of Fame
- Katherine Anne Porter, author
