= Moe & Gene Johnson High School =

Public school in Buda, Texas, United States

Location
- 4260 FM 967, Buda, TX; Buda, Texas 78610; United States
- Coordinates: 30.09933°N 97.89219°W

Information
- School type: High School
- Established: 2019; 7 years ago
- School district: Hays Consolidated Independent School District
- Superintendent: Eric Wright
- Principal: Rob Hensarling
- Grades: 9–12
- Enrollment: 2,976 (2025–2026)
- Colors: Gold and Black
- Athletics conference: UIL Class 6A
- Mascot: Jaguar
- Website: www.hayscisd.net/o/jhs

Moe & Gene Johnson High School, also called Buda Johnson or simply Johnson High School, is a public high school located in Buda, Texas as part of Hays Consolidated Independent School District. The school opened in 2019 and is classified by the University Interscholastic League as a 6A school as of 2025. The school's name comes from William "Moe" Johnson and Eugenia "Gene" Johnson, two influential people in the founding of Hays CISD.

== Athletics ==
=== Football ===
The Jaguars football team has qualified for two UIL High School playoffs since the school's founding: the 5A Division 1 playoffs in 2021, and the 6A Division 1 playoffs in 2024, in which the school advanced to the Regional round. It remains the furthest the Jaguars have advanced as of 2026.

=== Band ===
The Johnson High School Band participated in the 2025 season, qualifying for the UIL State Marching Contest for the first time in school history and placing 16th, before placing 13th at the BOA San Antonio Super Regional competition.
