= Kyle Unit =

Coordinates: 29°58′43″N 97°52′19″W

Kyle Unit (Kyle Correctional Center)
- Interactive map of Kyle Unit (Kyle Correctional Center)
- Location: 23001 I-35 Kyle, Texas
- Status: open
- Capacity: 520
- Opened: June 1989
- Managed by: Texas Department of Criminal Justice

The Kyle Unit (or Kyle Correctional Center) is a state prison for men located in Kyle, Hays County, Texas, which is operated by the Texas Department of Criminal Justice.

This facility was opened in June 1989, and a maximum capacity of 520 prisoners in special therapeutic and substance abuse programs.
