= Godzilla x Kong =

Godzilla x Kong may refer to:

- Godzilla x Kong: The New Empire, a film directed by Adam Wingard released in 2024
  - Godzilla x Kong: The New Empire (soundtrack), the soundtrack to the film
- Godzilla x Kong: Supernova, a film directed by Grant Sputore slated to release in 2027

== See also ==
- Godzilla (disambiguation)
- Kong (disambiguation)
- King Kong vs. Godzilla
- Godzilla vs. Kong
