= Boaz W. Long =

American diplomat

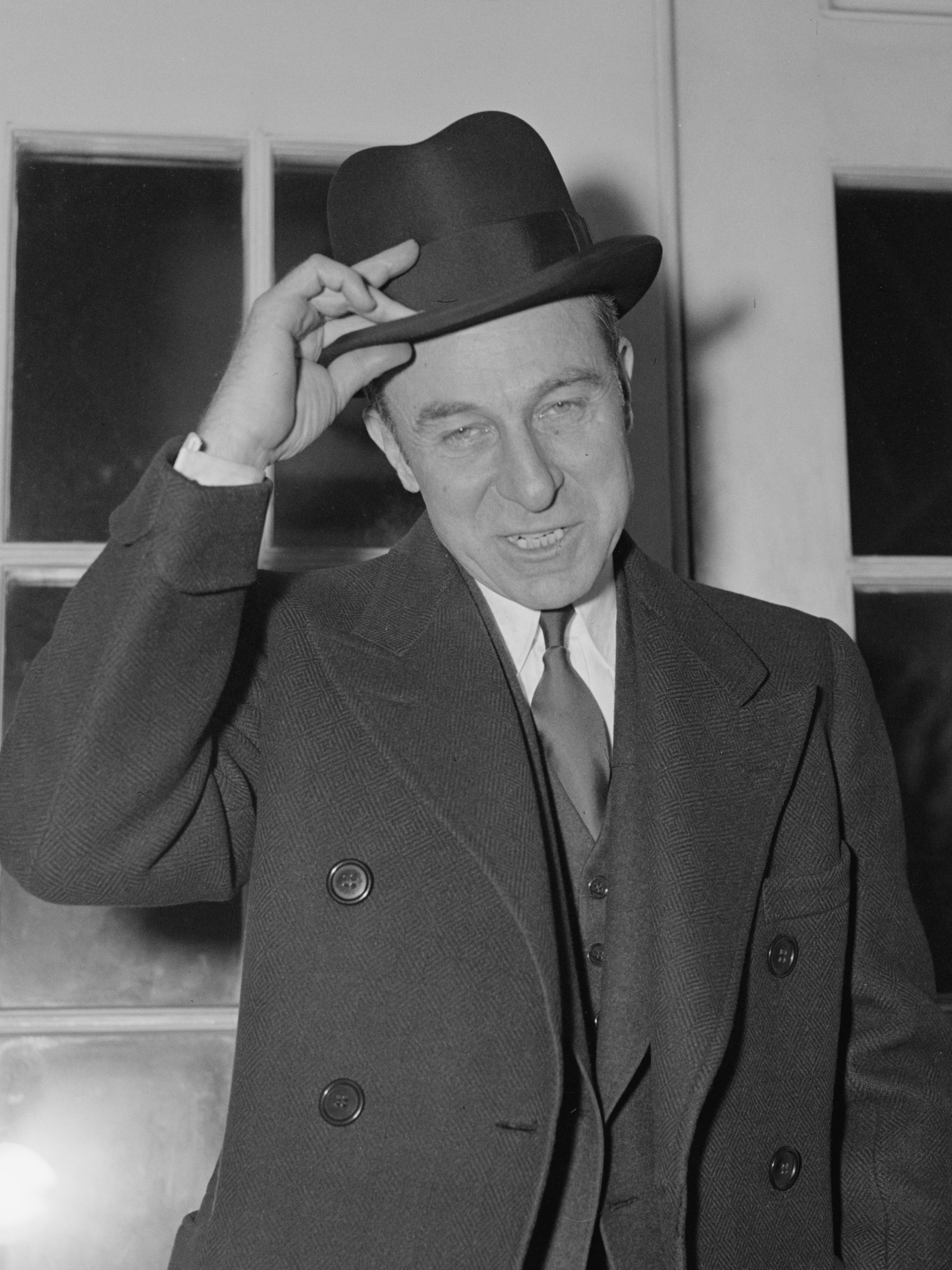
Boaz Long, 1940

Boaz Walton Long (1876 Warsaw, Indiana–1962) was a non-career appointee who served as the American Envoy Extraordinary and Minister Plenipotentiary to El Salvador (1914–1917), Cuba (1919–1921), Nicaragua (1936–1938) and Ecuador (appointed 1938). On April 14, 1942, he was promoted to Ambassador Extraordinary and Plenipotentiary April 14, 1942 and served until May 1, 1943. He also served as Ambassador Extraordinary and Plenipotentiary to Guatemala (1943–1945).

Long was born to Elisha Van Buren Long, who was appointed chief justice of New Mexico's Territorial Supreme Court in 1885, and Alice Rebecca (Walton) and grew up in Las Vegas, New Mexico. In 1948, Long became the director of the Museum of New Mexico, School of American Research, and Laboratory of Anthropology, retiring in 1956.

The U.S. Secretary of State under Woodrow Wilson, William Jennings Bryan, appointed Long to serve as Chief of the Division of the Latin American Affairs for the U.S. State Department in May 1913. Within a year, he “had proven himself to be a valuable asset to the state department, advising Secretary Bryan on the movements of General Pancho Villa during the Mexican Revolution, as well as meeting with President Wilson to discuss aiding American citizens then preparing to flee the Mexican capital due to the ongoing hostilities.”
