= Otto Jürgen Hofmann =

American pipe organ builder (1918–2001)

Otto Hofmann
- Born: Otto Jurgen Hofmann; December 9, 1918; Kyle, Texas, US
- Died: May 12, 2001 (aged 82); Austin, Texas, US
- Occupation: Pipe organ builder
- Spouse(s): Sarah Jane Rice (1940s); Margarete Schultze (1950 – 1977)
- Children: 7

Notes
- First American president of the International Society of Organbuilders (1980)

Otto Hofmann (December 9, 1918 – May 12, 2001) was a pipe organ builder and the first American president of the International Society of Organbuilders.

== Biography ==
Hofmann was born in Kyle, Texas on a cotton farm. He was the youngest of 10 children of German immigrants, Wilhelm and Frieda Hofmann. Otto attended Kyle High School and was valedictorian for his 1936 class. He received a bachelor's degree in Plan II and a master's degree in Choral Direction at the University of Texas. He was working on his doctorate when he was drafted. Being a conscientious objector, he was sent to Civilian Public Service Camp. After a brief marriage in the mid-1940s that resulted in two daughters, Helena (currently resides in Jacksonville, FL) and Pamela (currently resides in Jarretsville, MD) he returned to the family farm in Texas to resume his organ building career. In 1949, he traveled to Aspen, Colorado to hear Albert Schweitzer speak. There he met a young German woman, Margarete Schultze, who was helping Schweitzer with translation. She was a war refugee who had also traveled to hear Schweitzer speak. A year later, Otto invited her to Texas. He wanted to go to Germany to look up long lost relatives and she was homesick and wanted to return to Germany for a visit. In 1950, they were married in Berlin, Germany and Margarete Schultze became Margret Hofmann. They returned to Texas and had five children: Franz (1951), Barbara (1952), Anna (1956), Heidi (1960) and Stephen (1964). Over the years they accumulated many grandchildren and great grandchildren. In 1977, Otto and Margret divorced, but remained close friends until his death. Otto joined the Austin Friends Meeting (Quaker) in 1952 and was a central figure in the meeting until his death.

== Organ building career ==
Otto's organ building career began officially in 1947 but he built his first organ in 1937 when he was just 18 years old for his home church of Immanual Baptist Church in Kyle, Texas. In 1954 he moved to Austin from Kyle to expand his company. His largest organ was built for Margarete B. Parker Chapel at Trinity University in San Antonio, Texas. In 1980, he was elected as the first American president of the International Society of Organbuilders. After a heart attack in 1988, Otto retired from organ building decided to do a little acting. He died at the age of 82.

David J. Polley of the University of Nebraska wrote his 1993 doctoral dissertation on Hofmann's organ-building career, the abstract of which is quoted here in full:

Otto Hofmann, a Texas native, built organs in the Organ Reform style from the late 1940s through the 1980s. One of the first American post-World War II builders actively to design and build instruments following the precepts in Albert Schweitzer's 1906 treatise Deutsche und franzosische Orgelbaukunst, Hofmann is credited with building the first modern tracker action organ installed in a permanent, modern case in America in Albany, Texas in 1956. During his career, Hofmann was a leader in bringing the Organ Reform to Texas. Sensing a need for change in organ design, Hofmann studied instruments in Europe and worked to incorporate European ideals in the instruments he built for American churches and universities. He built organs throughout central Texas in addition to instruments in Louisiana, Arkansas, Oklahoma, and Illinois. Hofmann advocated low wind pressures, mechanical actions, encased instruments, and classically inspired stoplists. In addition, many of his apprentices are now successful organ builders. Hofmann's views concerning the organ as an accompanying instrument differed from many of the other progressive builders active in the 1950s and 60s. His experiences growing up near Kyle, Texas in a German settlement rich in the German choral singing tradition profoundly influenced his concepts of organ design and function. The organ needed to sing, in his opinion, and it should entice others to sing as well. This approach to organ sound differed from many other builders who were more interested in building replicas of historic instruments at the expense of practicality. During this time Hofmann was the undisputed leader in organ building in Texas. The number of instruments he built, plus his desire to work with any church which wished to have a pipe organ, helped establish the lighter, clearer sounds inspired by the Organ Reform. He was sought out because of the quality of his workmanship, his forward looking, practical designs, and the clarity of his voicing techniques.

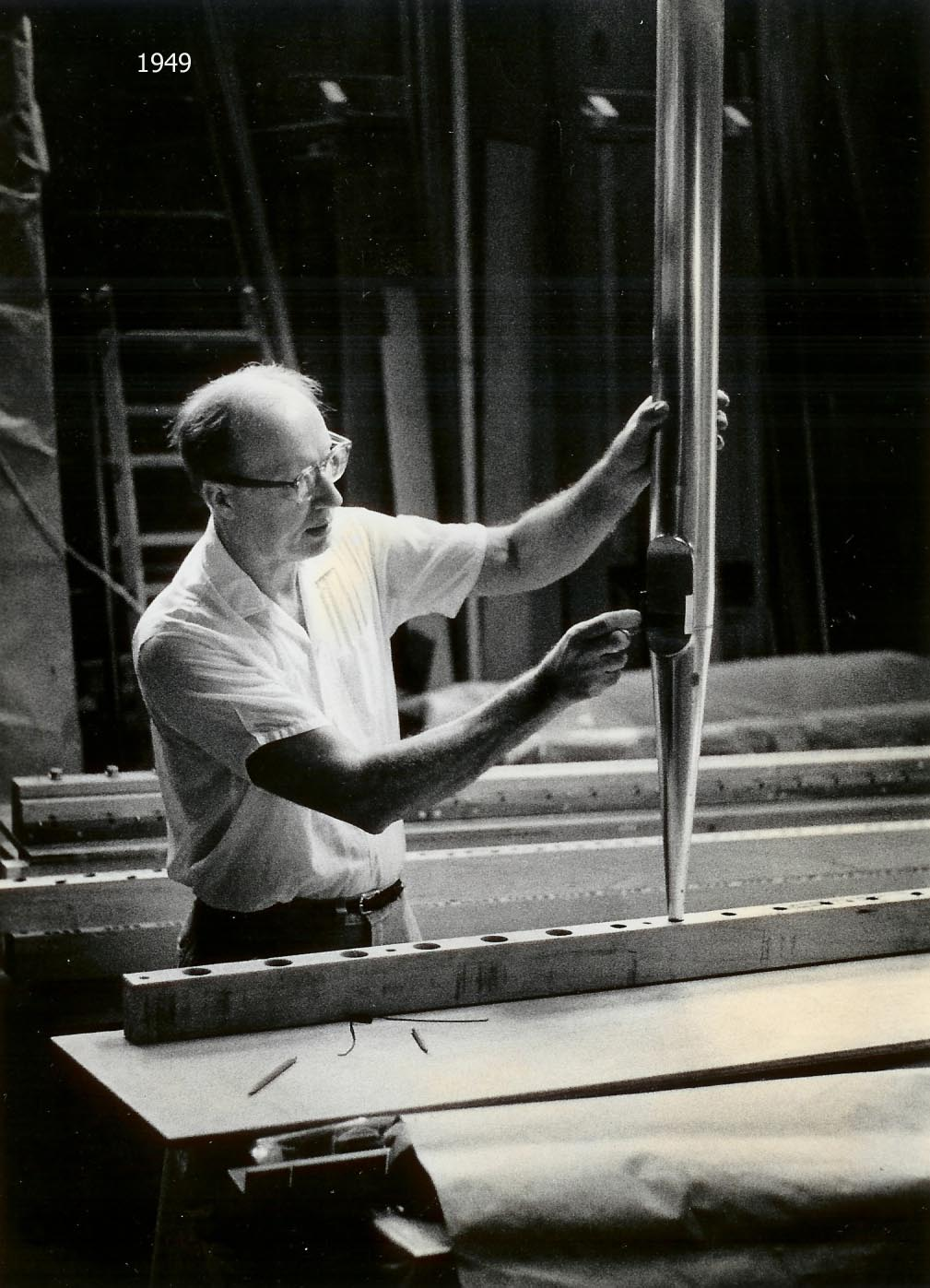

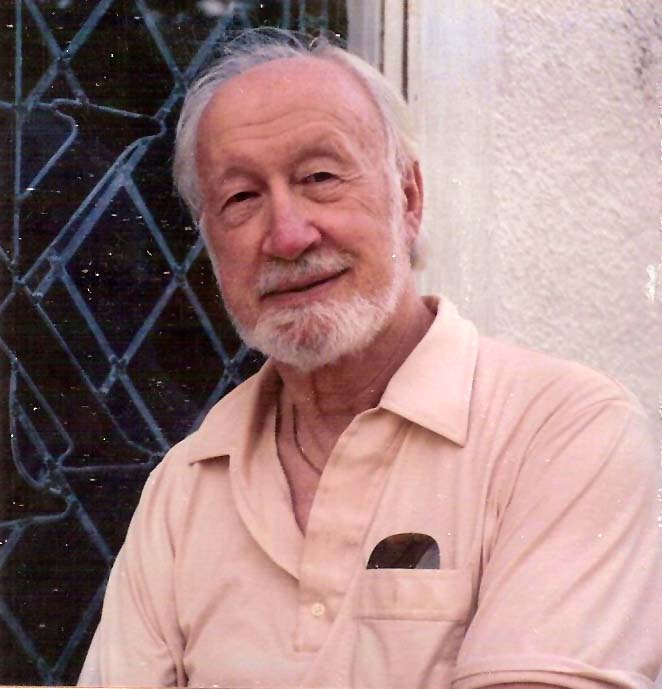

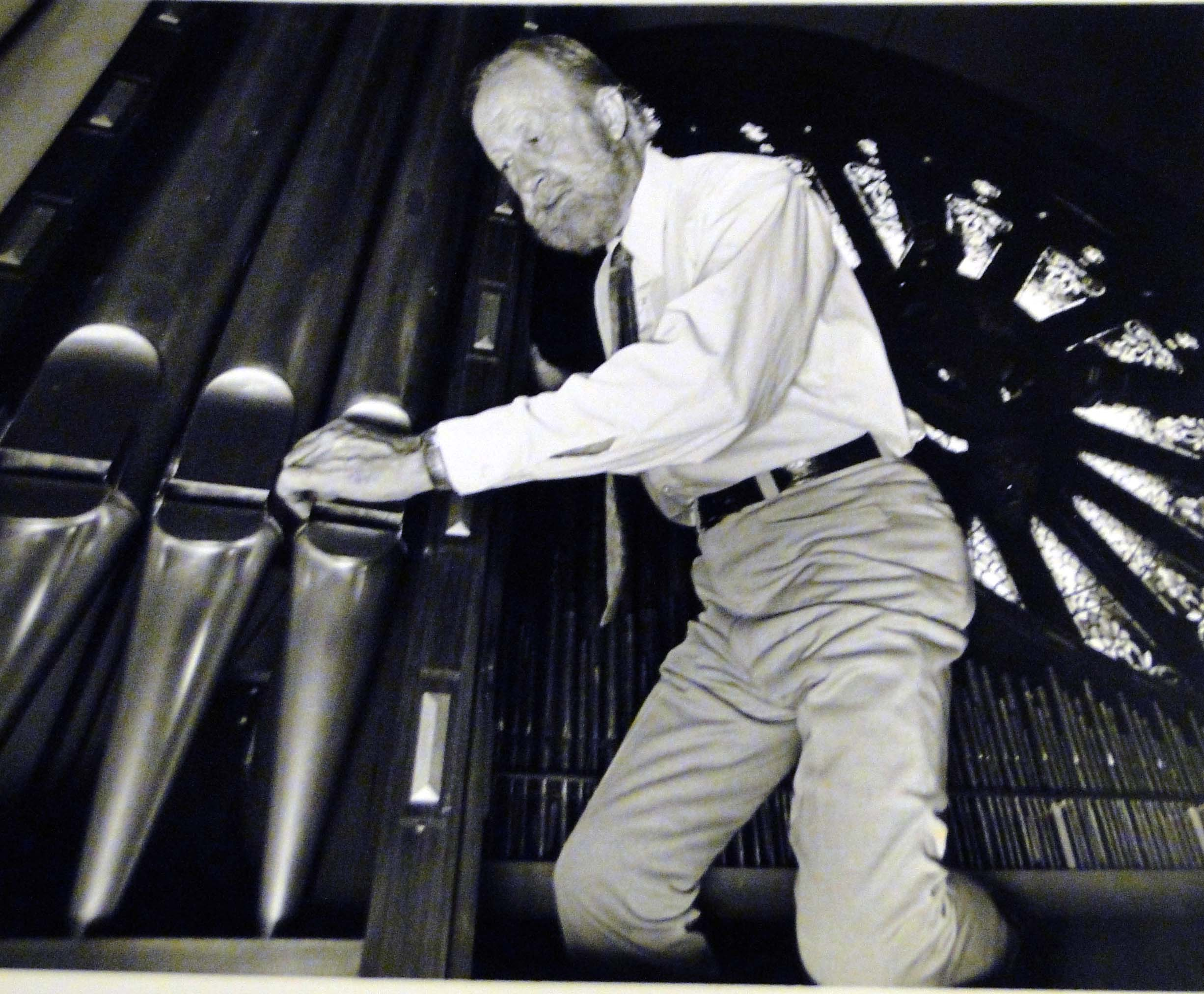

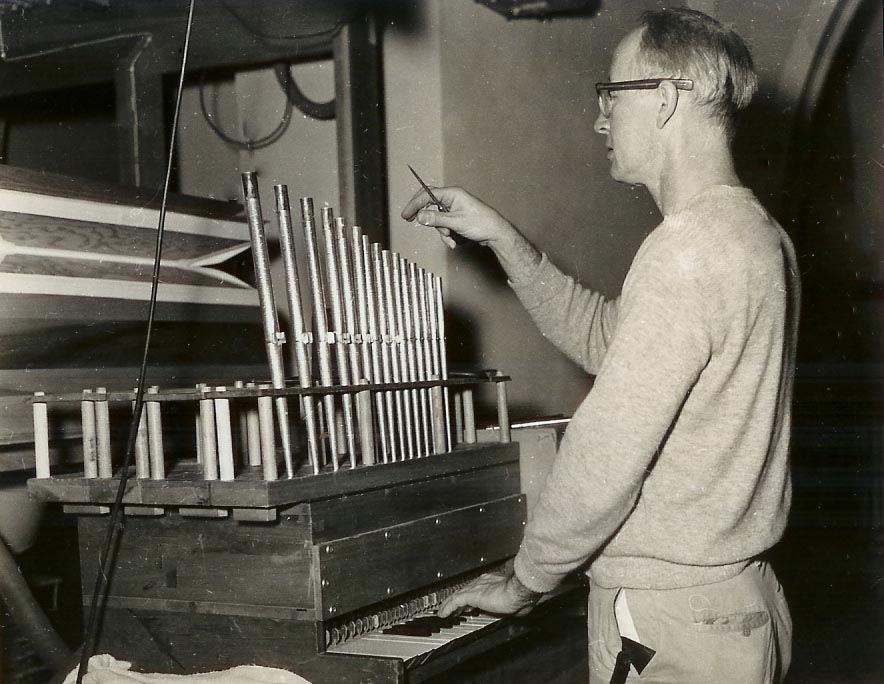

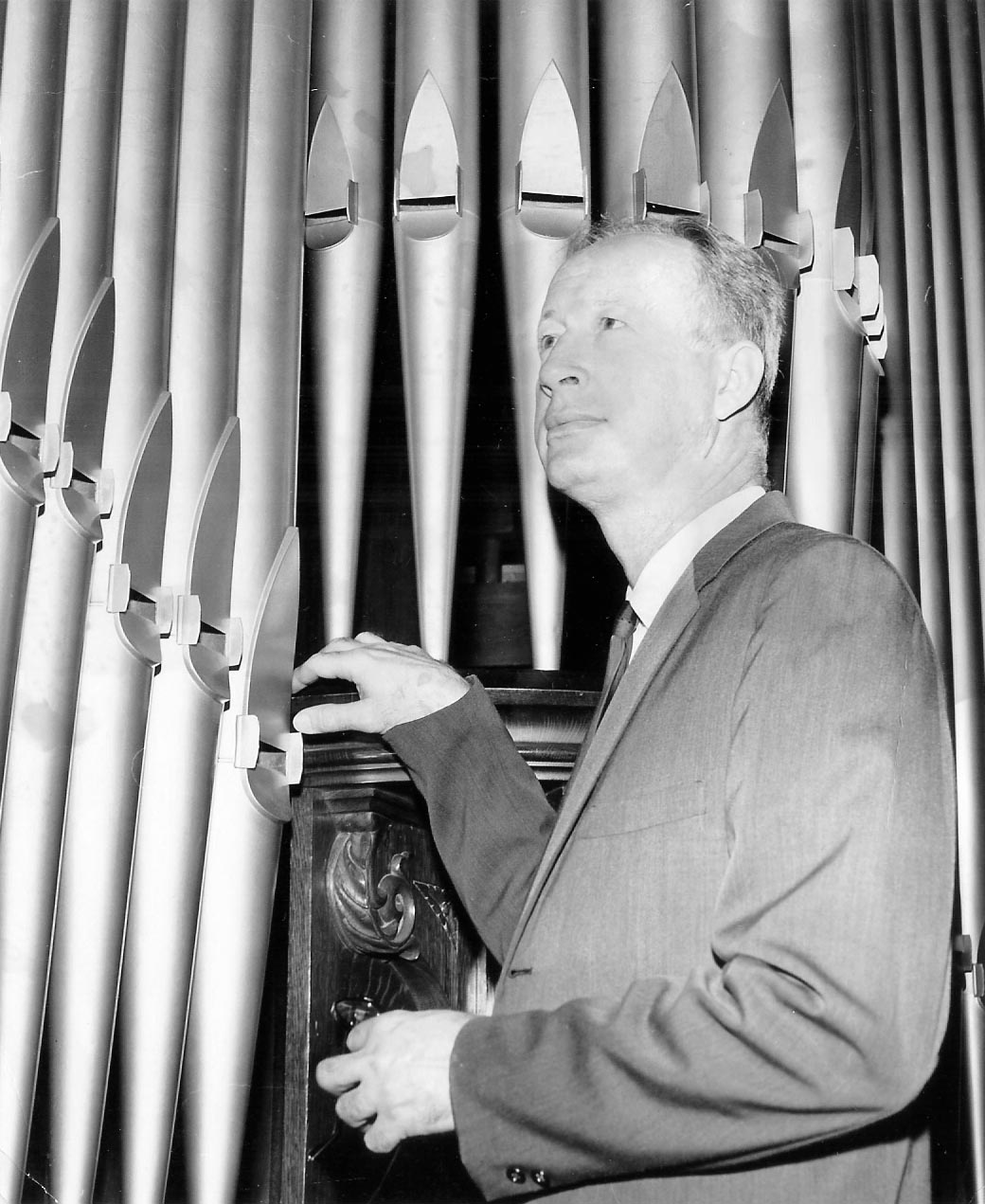

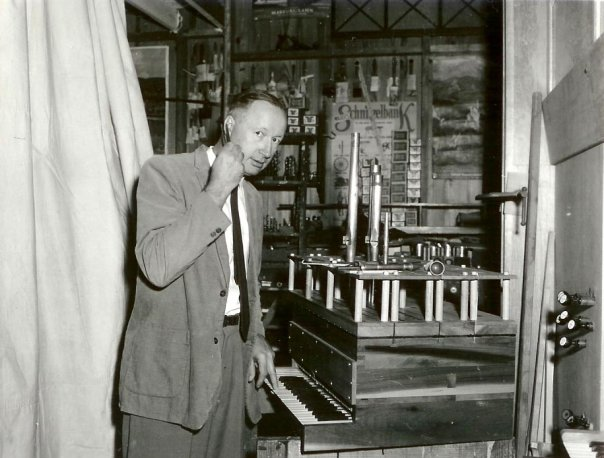
