= Hays Consolidated Independent School District =

School district in Texas, United States

Address
- 21003 Interstate 35 Kyle, Texas, 78640; United States

District information
- Grades: PK–12
- Schools: 26
- NCES District ID: 4800010

Students and staff
- Students: 23,313 (2023–2024)
- Teachers: 1,523.94 (on an FTE basis)
- Student–teacher ratio: 15.30:1

Other information
- Website: www.hayscisd.net

Hays Consolidated Independent School District is a public school district based in Kyle, Texas (USA). In addition to Kyle, the district serves the city of Buda, and other areas in northern Hays County. The Hays Consolidated Independent School District reaches more than 221 square miles. The district's 26 campuses are located throughout northern Hays County, serving over 20,000 students.

As of 2013 HCISD covers 3.8 square miles (9.8 km^{2}) of land within the City of Austin, making up 1.2% of the city's territory.

== History ==
The district was formed as a merger between the Buda, Kyle and Wimberly Independent School Districts in 1967 for financial purposes.

== Academic performance ==
In 2009, the school district was rated "academically acceptable" by the Texas Education Agency.

In 2023 Rachel Monroe of The New Yorker wrote "test scores and median incomes are above state averages, though not dramatically so."

== Student body ==
By 2023 the district had new immigrants from Guatemala, Honduras, and Mexico, a number characterized as significantly-sized by Eric Wright, the superintendent.

== Schools ==
=== High schools (Grades 9-12) ===
- Jack C. Hays High School, Buda
- Lehman High School, Kyle
- Moe & Gene Johnson High School, Buda
- Live Oak Academy
- Impact Center

=== Middle schools (Grades 6-8) ===
- Barton Middle School
- Chapa Middle School
- Dahlstrom Middle School
- McCormick Middle School
- Simon Middle School
- Wallace Middle School

=== Elementary schools ===
- Grades PK-5
  - Fuentes Elementary School
  - Green Elementary School
  - Hemphill Elementary School
  - Kyle Elementary School
  - Ramage Elementary School
  - Tobias Elementary School
- Grades K-5
  - Blanco Vista Elementary School
  - Buda Elementary School
  - Camino Real Elementary School
  - Carpenter Hill Elementary School
  - Cullen Elementary School
  - Elm Grove Elementary School
  - Negley Elementary School
  - Pfluger Elementary School
  - Science Hall Elementary School
  - Sunfield Elementary School
  - Uhland Elementary School

== Other facilities ==
The main building of the district headquarters was previously a business that sold supplies for tractors. Other administrative facilities are in temporary buildings.
