= Buda, Texas =

City in Texas, United States

- City
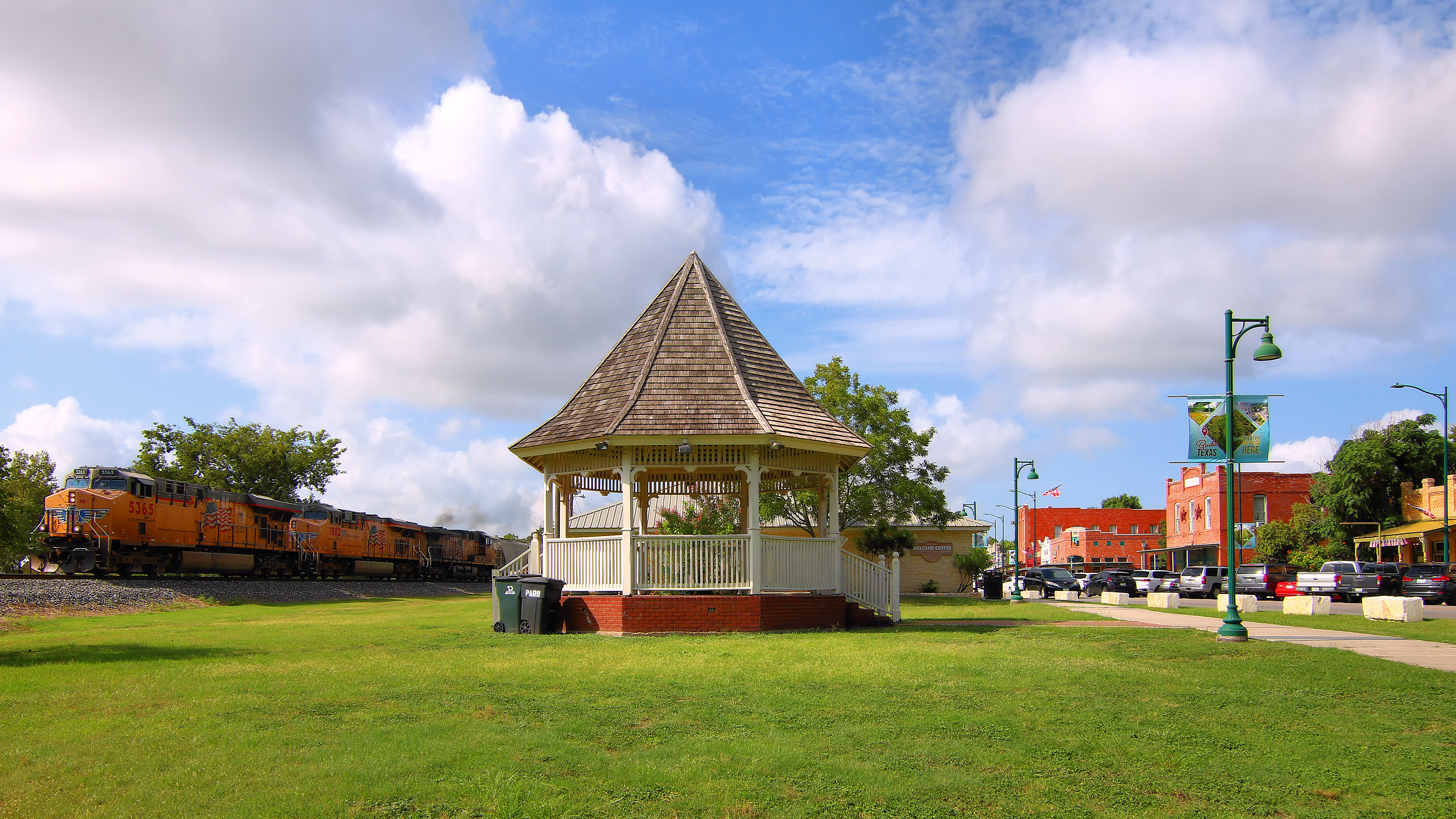
- The Downtown Gazebo on Main Street
- Interactive map of Buda, Texas
- Coordinates: 30°04′30″N 97°52′14″W
- Country: United States
- State: Texas
- County: Hays
- Incorporated: 1948

Government
  - Mayor: Lee Urbanovsky

Area
  - Total: 6.15 sq mi (15.94 km^{2})
  - Land: 6.15 sq mi (15.93 km^{2})
  - Water: 0.0077 sq mi (0.02 km^{2})
- Elevation: 722 ft (220 m)

Population (2020)
  - Total: 15,108
  - Density: 2,750/sq mi (1,061.6/km^{2})
- Demonym: Budan
- Time zone: UTC-6 (Central (CST))
  - Summer (DST): UTC-5 (CDT)
- ZIP code: 78610
- Area code(s): 512 & 737
- FIPS code: 48-11080
- GNIS feature ID: 2409930
- Website: www.budatx.gov

Buda (/ˈbjuːdə/ BYOO-də) is a city in Hays County, Texas, United States. The population was 15,108 in 2020, an increase over the figure of 7,295 tabulated in 2010. Buda is part of the Austin-Round Rock-San Marcos metropolitan statistical area and is one of Austin's fastest growing suburbs.

== History ==
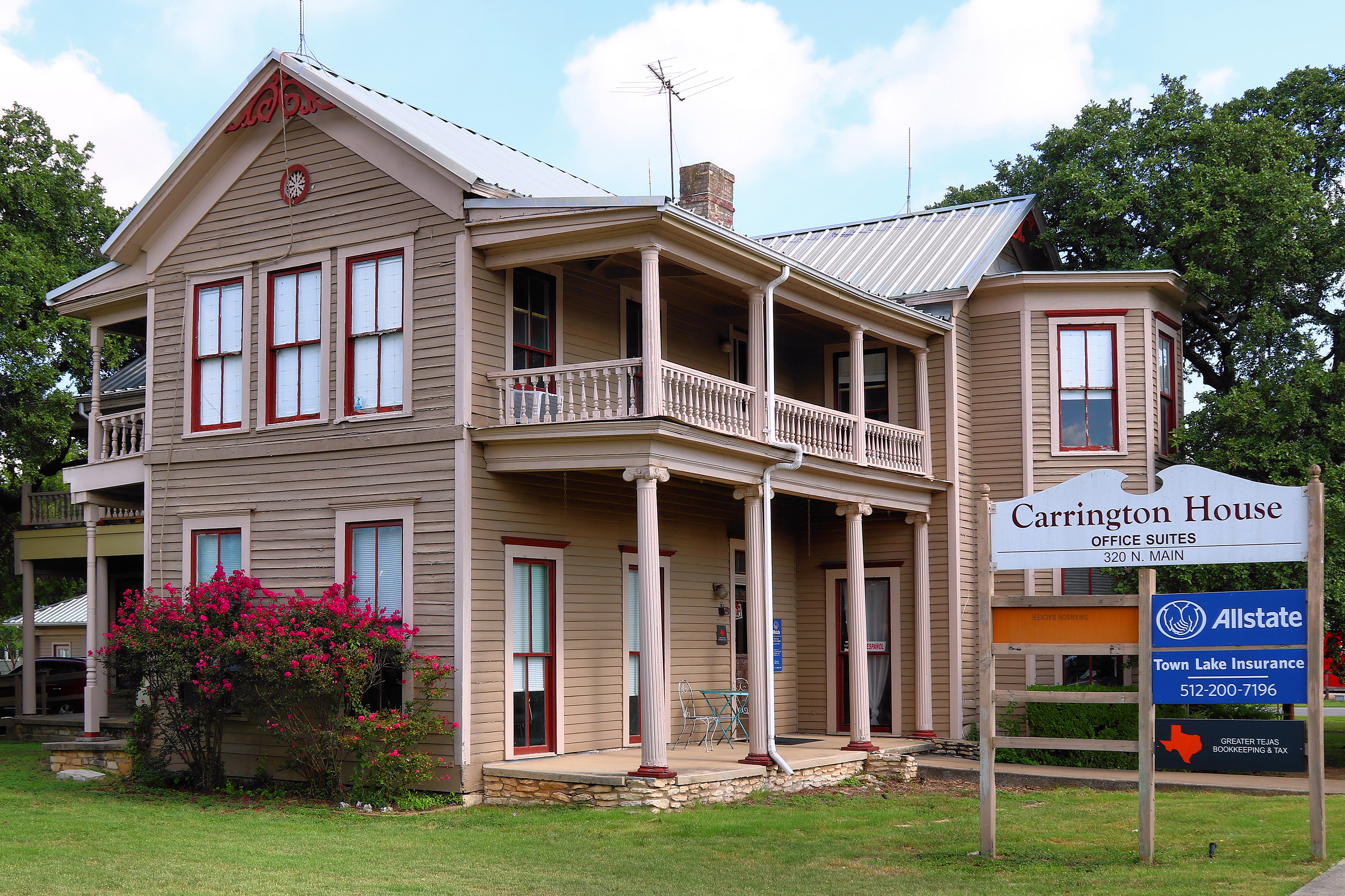
The former Carrington House Hotel

The town of Buda sprang up along the route of the International-Great Northern Railroad, which was extended from Austin to San Antonio in 1880. Buda bore the name of "Du Pre" from its birth in 1881 until the autumn of 1887, when postal officials became aware that another Texas town was also named Du Pre. Cornelia Trimble platted the town of Du Pre on April 1, 1881, establishing streets and a 150-foot (46 m) wide "Reservation" between the lots and the railroad right of way, which allowed the railroad to place buildings on the parkland, including the depot that would become the lifeblood of the town over the next few decades. Several businesses sprang up, including the Carrington Hotel, which served meals to railroad travelers. By the time Du Pre found a new name for itself, the Carrington hotel was known as the "Buda House". The "Dupre Notes" column of the Sept. 25, 1886, edition of the Hays County Times and Farmer's Journal notes that "The Buda House is one of the best hotels in the state. The polite and entertaining hostess, Mrs. Carrington, meets all with a courteous welcome." According to the town's oral tradition, "Buda" is a corruption of the Spanish word viuda, or "widow", referencing the widows who supposedly worked as cooks at the Carrington Hotel. Others suggest that like the town of Buda, Illinois, the town name is a nod to the exiles of the failed Hungarian Revolution of 1848 who settled in the area.

Buda was incorporated in 1948. By the mid-1980s it had attracted a cement plant and some craft industry.

== Geography ==
Buda is in northeastern Hays County. It is 15 miles (24 km) southwest of downtown Austin and 65 miles (105 km) northeast of San Antonio on Interstate 35. Just to the north of Buda is Texas State Highway 45, a major toll loop of Austin. Almost immediately north of Buda is the county line bordering Travis County and the Austin city limits.

According to the United States Census Bureau, Buda has a total area of 5.4 square miles (13.9 km^{2}), of which 0.01 square miles (0.02 km^{2}), or 0.11%, are water. Onion Creek flows through the northwest side of the city, a tributary of the Colorado River.

== Demographics ==
Historical population
Census	Pop.	Note	%±
1950	483		—
1960	451		−6.6%
1970	498		10.4%
1980	597		19.9%
1990	1,795		200.7%
2000	2,404		33.9%
2010	7,295		203.5%
2020	15,108		107.1%
2025 (est.)	16,166		7.0%
U.S. Decennial Census

=== 2020 census ===
As of the 2020 census, Buda had a population of 15,108 and 4,314 families residing in the city. The median age was 36.2 years, 28.7% of residents were under the age of 18, and 11.4% of residents were 65 years of age or older. For every 100 females there were 93.6 males, and for every 100 females age 18 and over there were 90.5 males age 18 and over.

99.5% of residents lived in urban areas, while 0.5% lived in rural areas.

There were 5,273 households in Buda, of which 45.2% had children under the age of 18 living in them. Of all households, 60.0% were married-couple households, 12.5% were households with a male householder and no spouse or partner present, and 21.7% were households with a female householder and no spouse or partner present. About 18.7% of all households were made up of individuals and 7.6% had someone living alone who was 65 years of age or older.

There were 5,401 housing units, of which 2.4% were vacant. Among occupied housing units, 75.0% were owner-occupied and 25.0% were renter-occupied. The homeowner vacancy rate was 0.5% and the rental vacancy rate was 4.5%.

Buda racial composition as of 2020 (NH = Non-Hispanic) (Note: Note: the US Census treats Hispanic/Latino as an ethnic category. This table excludes Latinos from the racial categories and assigns them to a separate category. Hispanics/Latinos can be of any race.)
Race	Number	Percentage
White (NH)	8,499	56.25%
Hispanic or Latino	5,275	34.92%
Black or African American (NH)	397	2.63%
Native American or Alaska Native (NH)	36	0.24%
Asian (NH)	254	1.68%
Pacific Islander (NH)	5	0.03%
Some Other Race (NH)	58	0.38%
Mixed/Multi-Racial (NH)	584	3.87%
Total	15,108	

=== 2000 census ===
As of the census of 2000, there were 2,404 people, 866 households, and 685 families residing in the city. Based on utility hook-ups, the city estimated its 2008 population to be in excess of 5,000 residents. The population density was 998.5 inhabitants per square mile (385.5/km^{2}). There were 910 housing units at an average density of 378.0 per square mile (145.9/km^{2}). The racial makeup of the city was 81.95% White, 1.58% African American, 0.54% Native American, 0.87% Asian, 12.02% from other races, and 3.04% from two or more races. Hispanic or Latino of any race were 26.83% of the population.

There were 866 households, out of which 44.7% had children under the age of 18 living with them, 65.5% were married couples living together, 10.9% had a female householder with no husband present, and 20.8% were non-families. 17.1% of all households were made up of individuals, and 7.5% had someone living alone who was 65 years of age or older. The average household size was 2.78 and the average family size was 3.13.

In the city, the population was spread out, with 29.7% under the age of 18, 6.4% from 18 to 24, 36.7% from 25 to 44, 19.7% from 45 to 64, and 7.4% who were 65 years of age or older. The median age was 32 years. For every 100 females, there were 92.3 males. For every 100 females age 18 and over, there were 90.3 males.

The median income for a household in the city was $54,135, and the median income for a family was $57,321. Males had a median income of $37,398 versus $30,064 for females. The per capita income for the city was $22,167. About 3.3% of families and 3.7% of the population were below the poverty line, including 5.0% of those under age 18 and 14.7% of those age 65 or over.

=== 2006–2007 economic data ===
As of 2007, Buda recorded $384 million of assessed property value within city limits. Based on a February 2007 survey of 14 central Texas cities, Buda had the highest per capita assessed property value at $85,431 per resident. The city recorded more than $3 million in sales tax collection in 2006, for a per capita sales tax collection of $675.

== Economy ==
Buda is home to numerous fast-growing small- to medium-sized businesses.

== Arts and culture ==
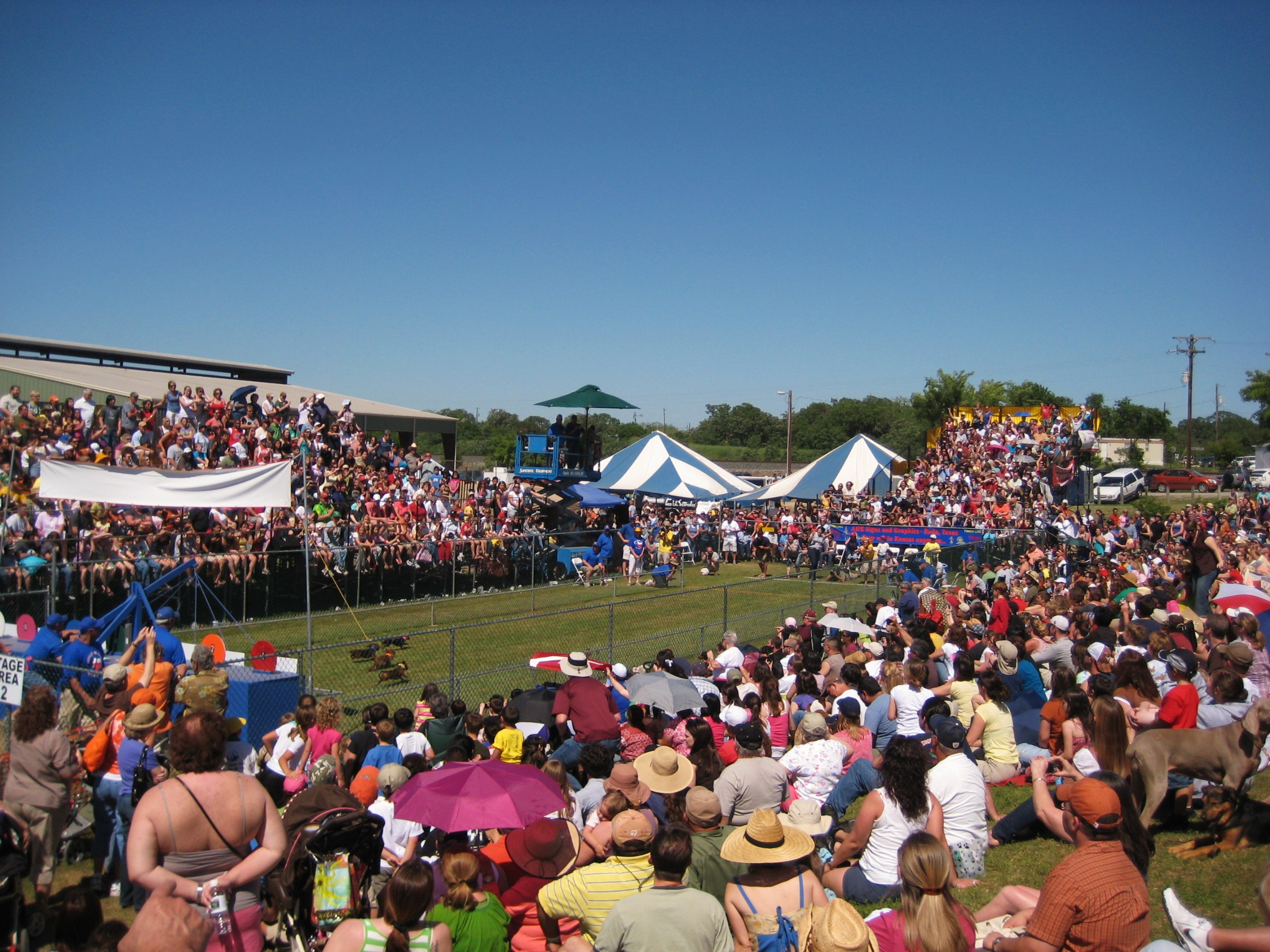
The Weiner Dog Races in Buda is a popular area event.

Buda is a commuter town south of Austin. Commercial development along the I-35 corridor, such as the Cabela's sporting goods store, has increased city sales tax revenue, and city leaders hope that further revitalization of downtown Buda will attract tourists and residents to the Main Street area.

Buda attracts national attention for its lighthearted wiener dog races, organized every April by the Buda Lions Club. Rooster Teeth Productions, the creators of the machinima series Red vs. Blue and The Strangerhood, had its office in Buda until moving back to Austin.

== Government ==
Buda is a home rule city with a council-manager form of government. Other governmental entities include the Buda Planning and Zoning Commission, the Historical Commission, the Parks Commission, the Board of Adjustments and the Economic Development Corporation. Citizen Groups active in local politics include the Buda Area Chamber of Commerce and the Buda Downtown Merchants Association.

In November 2007, Buda citizens adopted a home rule charter by a margin of 77.85 percent, allowing the city to transition from general law to home rule.

== Education ==
Buda is served by the Hays Consolidated Independent School District. Buda Elementary, built in 1885, sits just outside Main Street and serves 500 students from the Buda area. Buda students attend Carpenter Hill Elementary School, Elm Grove Elementary School, Dahlstrom Middle School, Jack C. Hays High School, and Moe and Gene Johnson High School.

== Notable people ==
- Gary Clarke, retired actor, co-starred on The Virginian, 1962–1964
- Jen Hatmaker, author, blogger
- Tex Hughson, Boston Red Sox pitcher
- Samuel Ealy Johnson Jr., Texas state legislator and father of President Lyndon Johnson
- Donald K. Muchow, Rear Admiral and former U.S. Navy Chief of Chaplains (1994–1997)
- Tommy Shannon, musician and former bass player of Stevie Ray Vaughan Double Trouble.

== See also ==
- Garlic Creek
