= List of Tree Cities USA =

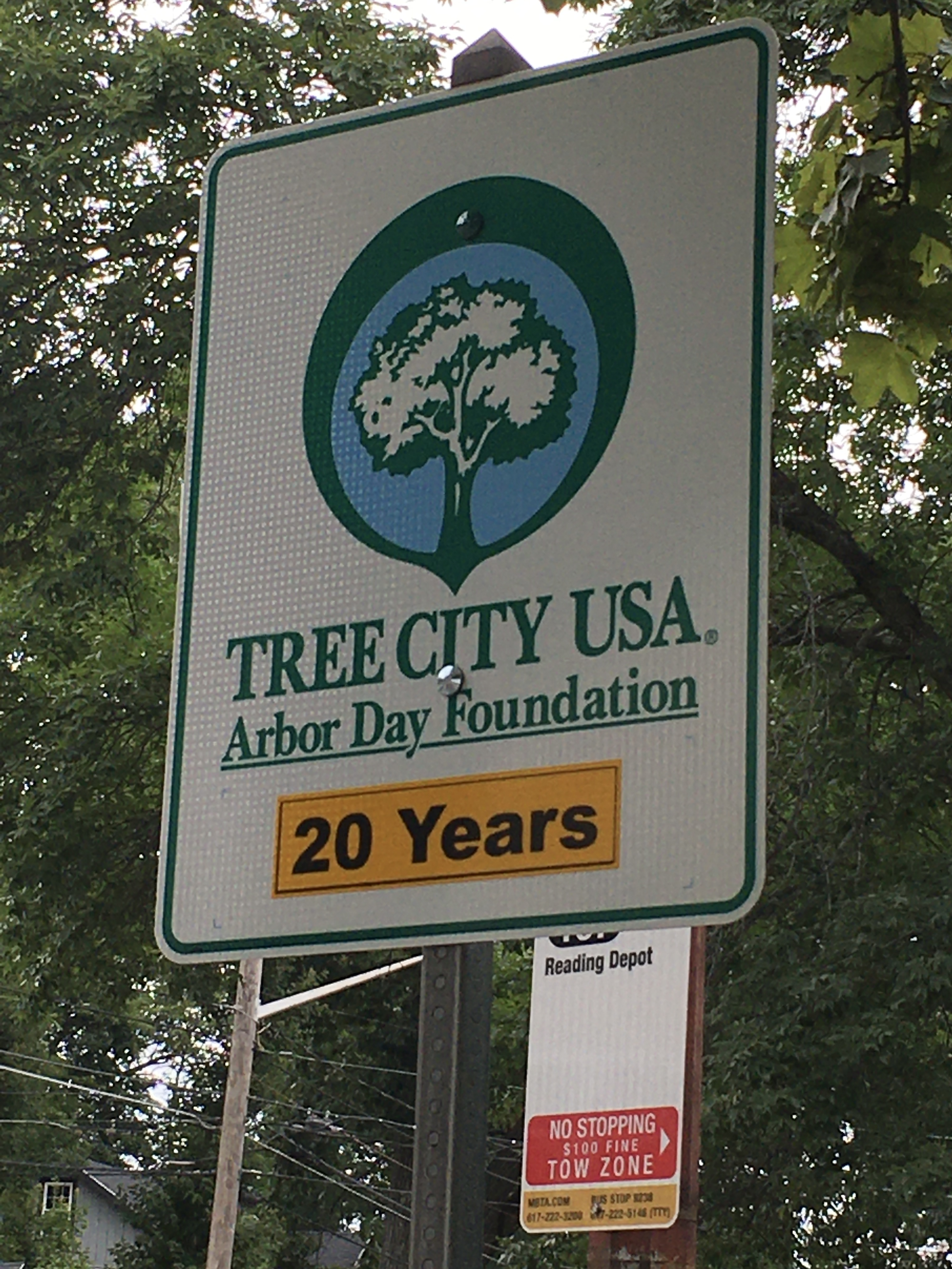
Tree City USA sign in Wakefield, Massachusetts

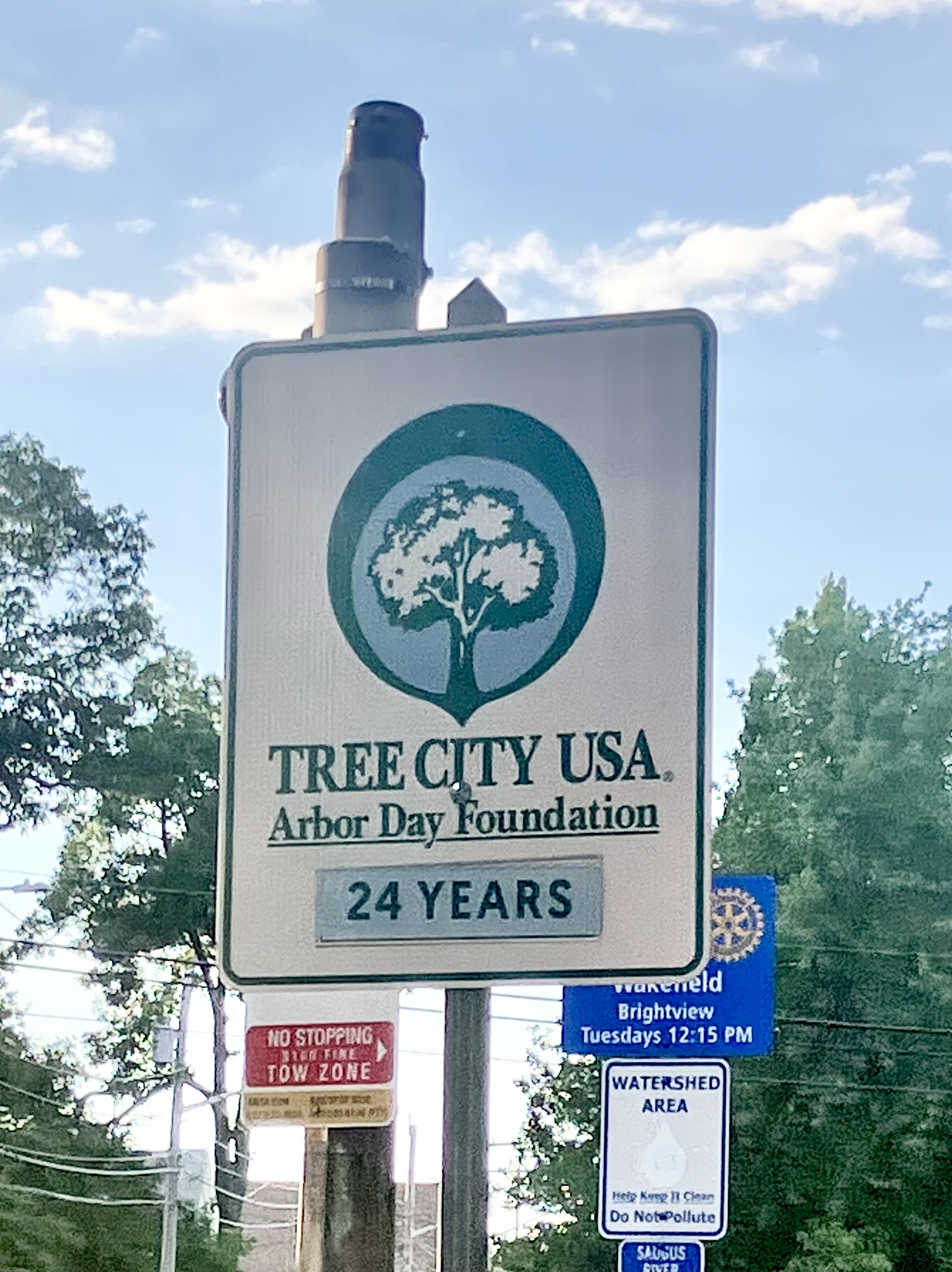
The same Wakefield sign photographed in 2026, showing the continued declaration of the town's status as a Tree City USA

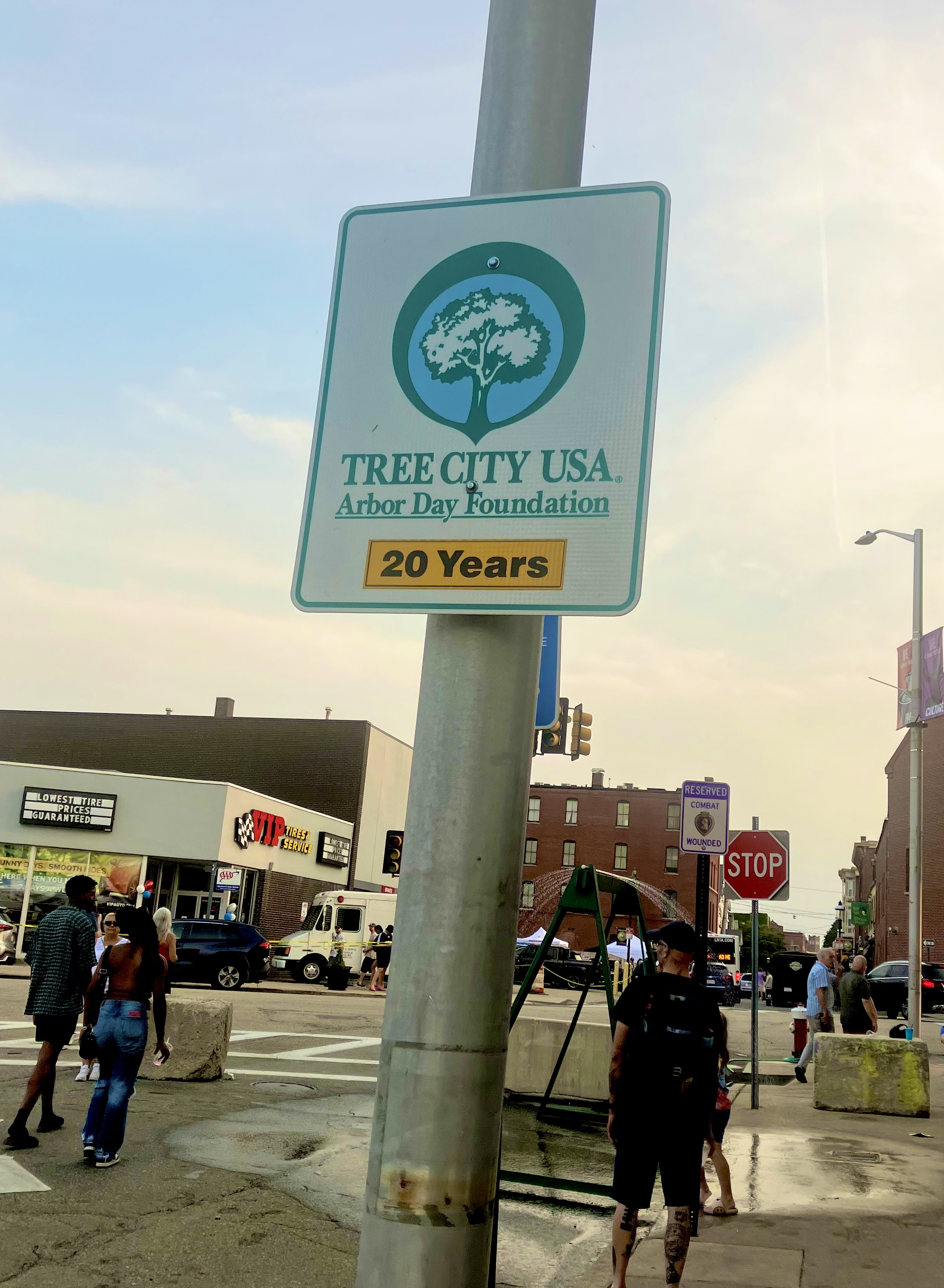
Tree City USA sign in Lowell, Massachusetts, near the corner of Merrimack and Worthen Streets

There are more than 3,400 Tree Cities USA.

The following is a partial listing of Tree Cities USA. To be a Tree City, the community must meet four standards set by the National Arbor Day Foundation and the National Association of State Foresters:

1. The community must have a tree board or department.
2. The community must have established a community ordinance for tree care.
3. There must be a community forestry program with an annual budget of at least $2 per capita.
4. The community must have an Arbor Day observance and proclamation.

== States ==
=== Alabama ===
- Abbeville
- Alabaster
- Auburn
- Bay Minette
- Birmingham
- Daphne
- Demopolis
- Elberta
- Fairhope
- Florence
- Foley
- Gadsden
- Gulf Shores
- Huntsville
- Leeds
- Loxley
- Madison
- Magnolia Springs
- Mobile
- Mountain Brook
- Orange Beach
- Robertsdale
- Silverhill
- Valley

=== Alaska ===
- Anchorage
- Eagle River
- Fort Wainwright
- Juneau
- Ketchikan
- Sitka
- Wasilla

=== Arizona ===
- Avondale
- Buckeye
- Camp Verde
- Casa Grande
- Chandler
- Coolidge
- Gilbert
- Glendale
- Kingman
- Lake Havasu City
- Litchfield Park
- Mesa
- Patagonia
- Peoria
- Phoenix
- Pinetop-Lakeside
- Prescott Valley
- Quartzsite
- Scottsdale
- Show Low
- Tempe
- Tucson

=== Arkansas ===
- Bella Vista
- Bentonville
- Conway
- Eureka Springs
- Fayetteville
- Little Rock
- Maumelle
- Mineral Springs

=== California ===
- Alhambra
- Anaheim
- Bakersfield
- Beverly Hills
- Brentwood
- Burbank
- Burlingame
- Calabasas
- Cerritos
- Chico
- Claremont
- Clovis
- Corona
- Coronado
- Costa Mesa
- Culver City
- Davis
- East Palo Alto
- Eastvale
- Encinitas
- Fremont
- Fullerton
- Gilroy
- Hayward
- Highland
- Hemet
- Irvine
- Lakewood
- La Mirada
- Lodi
- Lompoc
- Los Angeles
- Martinez
- Menlo Park
- Merced
- Mission Viejo
- Modesto
- Monterey
- Napa
- Oakland
- Ojai
- Orange
- Pasadena
- Placentia
- Poway
- Sacramento
- St. Helena
- San Bernardino
- San Dimas
- San Fernando
- San Francisco
- San Jose
- San Leandro
- San Ramon
- Santa Ana
- Santa Clara
- Santa Clarita
- Santee
- Saratoga
- Seaside
- South Pasadena
- Stockton
- Upland
- Whittier
- Woodland

==== Pending ====
- Aliso Viejo

=== Colorado ===
- Arvada
- Aurora
- Boulder
- Castle Rock
- Colorado Springs
- Denver
- Elizabeth
- Erie
- Evans
- Fort Collins
- Greeley
- Greenwood Village
- Longmont
- Parker
- Pierce
- Sterling
- Wheat Ridge

=== Connecticut ===
- Avon
- Bridgeport
- Danbury
- Easton
- Fairfield
- Hartford
- Middletown
- Norwalk
- Stamford
- Torrington

=== Delaware ===
- Reference
- Arden
- Ardentown
- Bethany Beach
- Delaware City
- Dover
- Dover Air Force Base
- Georgetown
- Henlopen Acres
- Lewes
- Milford
- Newark
- New Castle
- Odessa
- Ocean View
- Rehoboth Beach
- Smyrna
- Wilmington

=== Florida ===
- Altamonte Springs
- Apopka
- Aventura
- Belleair
- Boca Raton
- Boynton Beach
- Bradenton
- Brooksville
- Bushnell
- Cape Canaveral
- Cape Coral
- Clearwater
- Coconut Creek
- Cooper City
- Coral Gables
- Coral Springs
- Crescent City
- Crystal River
- Cutler Bay
- Davie
- Daytona Beach
- DeLand
- Destin
- Doral
- Dunedin
- El Portal
- Eustis
- Fort Lauderdale
- Fort Myers
- Fort Myers Beach
- Fort Pierce
- Fort Walton Beach
- Gainesville
- Golden Beach
- Green Cove Springs
- Greenacres
- Gulf Breeze
- Gulfport
- Hallandale
- Hollywood
- Hurlburt Field
- Inverness
- Interlachen
- Jacksonville
- Jacksonville Beach
- Juno Beach
- Jupiter
- Keystone Heights
- Key West
- Lady Lake
- Lake Park
- Lakeland
- Lantana
- Largo
- Lauderhill
- Leesburg
- Leon County
- Lighthouse Point
- Lynn Haven
- MacDill Air Force Base
- Maitland
- Margate
- Marianna
- Melbourne
- Miami
- Miami Beach
- Miami Gardens
- Miami Lakes
- Milton
- Miramar
- Monticello
- Mount Dora
- Naples
- Naval Air Station Whiting Field – South
- Neptune Beach
- New Port Richey
- Niceville
- North Miami
- North Miami Beach
- Oakland
- Oakland Park
- Ocala
- Oldsmar
- Orange County
- Orange Park
- Orlando
- Ormond Beach
- Oviedo
- Palatka
- Palm Beach Gardens
- Palm Beach Shores
- Palm Coast
- Palm Springs
- Palmetto Bay
- Panama City
- Parkland
- Patrick Space Force Base
- Pembroke Pines
- Pensacola
- Naval Air Station Pensacola
- Perry
- Pinecrest
- Pinellas Park
- Plantation
- Pomona Park
- Pompano Beach
- Ponce Inlet
- Port Orange
- Port St. Lucie
- Punta Gorda
- Rockledge
- Royal Palm Beach
- Safety Harbor
- St. Augustine
- St. Augustine Beach
- St. Pete Beach
- St. Petersburg
- San Antonio
- Sanford
- Sanibel
- Sarasota
- Sarasota County
- Seminole
- Sewall's Point
- South Pasadena
- Sunny Isles Beach
- Sunrise
- Surfside
- Tallahassee
- Tamarac
- Tampa
- Tarpon Springs
- Temple Terrace
- Titusville
- Treasure Island
- Vero Beach
- Virginia Gardens
- Wellington
- West Miami
- West Palm Beach
- Wildwood
- Windermere
- Winter Haven
- Winter Park
- Winter Springs
- Zephyrhills

=== Georgia ===
- Athens–Clarke County
- Ball Ground
- Berkeley Lake
- Bethlehem
- Clayton
- Columbus
- Dalton
- Duluth
- Griffin
- Madison
- Newnan
- Roswell
- Savannah
- Smyrna
- Suwanee

=== Hawaii ===
- Honolulu
- Mililani Town
- Schofield Barracks

=== Idaho ===
- Aberdeen
- Boise
- Caldwell
- Coeur D'Alene
- Idaho Falls
- Pocatello

=== Illinois ===
- Arlington Heights
- Aurora
- Berwyn
- Brookfield
- Buffalo Grove
- Carbondale
- Chicago
- East Dundee
- Elmhurst
- Evanston
- Geneva
- Glen Ellyn
- Glenview
- Gridley
- Highland
- Hinsdale
- Lake Forest
- Lombard
- Lockport
- Lindenhurst
- Mackinaw
- Mokena
- Morton Grove
- Mount Carroll
- Mount Prospect
- Nauvoo
- Niles
- Oak Park
- Orland Park
- Park Ridge
- Quincy
- River Grove
- River Forest
- South Elgin
- Streamwood
- Urbana
- Wilmette

=== Indiana ===
- Anderson
- Angola
- Auburn
- Bedford
- Beech Grove
- Berne
- Bloomington
- Carmel
- Chesterton
- Columbia City
- Crown Point
- Culver
- Decatur
- Delphi
- East Chicago
- Edgewood
- Elkhart
- Evansville
- Fortville
- Fort Wayne
- Fremont
- Goshen
- Greencastle
- Greendale
- Greenfield
- Grissom Air Reserve Base
- Huntington
- Indianapolis
- La Porte
- Lafayette
- Merrillville
- Middlebury
- Madison
- Michigan City
- Mishawaka
- Mitchell
- Montpelier
- Mount Ayr
- Muncie
- Munster
- Nappanee
- Nashville
- New Albany
- New Harmony
- Newport
- Noblesville
- North Manchester
- Pendleton
- Rensselaer
- Richmond
- Rochester
- Salem
- Seymour
- South Bend
- Syracuse
- Terre Haute
- Tipton
- Valparaiso
- West Lafayette
- Whiting
- Winamac
- Zionsville

=== Iowa ===
- Adel
- Ames
- Arnolds Park
- Atlantic
- Bettendorf
- Bondurant
- Boone
- Burlington
- Carlisle
- Carroll
- Cedar Falls
- Cedar Rapids
- Clarksville
- Clive
- Coralville
- Council Bluffs
- Cresco
- Decorah
- De Witt
- Denver
- Des Moines
- Dubuque
- Dysart
- Fort Dodge
- Greene
- Grimes
- Grundy Center
- Hampton
- Hiawatha
- Hillsboro
- Hopkinton
- Hudson
- Huxley
- Indianola
- Iowa City
- Jefferson
- Johnston
- Livermore
- Luxemburg
- Manchester
- Maquoketa
- Marion
- Marquette
- Marshalltown
- Mason City
- Maxwell
- Mt. Vernon
- Muscatine
- Nevada
- Newton
- North Liberty
- Odebolt
- Oelwein
- Oskaloosa
- Ottumwa
- Pleasant Hill
- Polk City
- Red Oak
- Sioux City
- Spencer
- Story City
- Tipton
- Urbandale
- Van Horne
- Washington
- Waterloo
- Waverly
- Webster City
- West Des Moines
- Winterset

=== Kansas ===
- Anthony
- Clay Center
- De Soto
- Emporia
- Haysville
- Mission
- Ottawa
- Salina

=== Kentucky ===
- Anchorage
- Ashland
- Bowling Green
- Carrollton
- Durham
- Fort Thomas
- Lexington
- Russellville

=== Louisiana ===
- Abita Springs
- Alexandria
- Gonzales
- New Orleans

=== Maine ===
- Reference
- Augusta
- Auburn
- Bath
- Bangor
- Brunswick
- Camden
- Castine
- Colby College (designated as a Tree Campus USA)
- Ellsworth
- Dover-Foxcroft
- Falmouth
- Farmington
- Hallowell
- Hampden
- Kennebunkport
- Orono
- Portland
- Saco
- South Portland
- Westbrook
- Yarmouth

=== Maryland ===
- Baltimore
- Berwyn Heights
- Boonsboro
- Bowie
- Frederick
- Havre de Grace
- Howard County
- Hyattsville
- Montgomery Village
- La Plata
- North Beach
- Rockville
- Takoma Park
- University Park

=== Massachusetts ===
- Acton
- Arlington
- Amherst
- Attleboro
- Barnstable
- Beverly
- Billerica
- Boston
- Cohasset
- Dalton
- Dedham
- Danvers
- Easthampton
- Hinsdale
- Lowell
- Lynnfield
- Medfield
- Medford
- Nantucket
- Newburyport
- Newton
- Norfolk
- Norwood
- Peabody
- Pittsfield
- Reading
- Saugus
- Wakefield
- Westfield
- Wilmington
- Winchester
- Woburn

=== Michigan ===
- Adrian
- Albion
- Allegan
- Alma
- Alpena
- Ann Arbor
- Auburn Hills
- Battle Creek
- Bay City
- Belding
- Berkley
- Big Rapids
- Birmingham
- Boyne City
- Breckenridge
- Brighton
- Buchanan
- Cadillac
- Caledonia
- Canton Township
- Caro
- Charlevoix
- Charlotte
- Clare
- Clawson
- Clio
- Coldwater
- Davison
- Dearborn
- Dearborn Heights
- Detroit
- Dewitt
- Dowagiac
- Dundee
- East Grand Rapids
- East Lansing
- Eastpointe
- Evart
- Escanaba
- Ferndale
- Frankenmuth
- Frankfort
- Franklin
- Fraser
- Fremont
- Dexter
- Gaylord
- Gladstone
- Glen Arbor
- Grand Blanc
- Grand Haven
- Grand Rapids
- Grosse Pointe
- Grosse Pointe Farms
- Grosse Pointe Park
- Grosse Pointe Shores
- Grosse Pointe Woods
- Hamtramck
- Hillsdale
- Holland
- Holly
- Howard City
- Huntington Woods
- Imlay City
- Ionia
- Iron Mountain
- Jackson
- Kalamazoo
- Laingsburg
- Lake Odessa
- Lansing
- Lapeer
- Lathrup Village
- Lincoln Park
- Livonia
- Lowell
- Mackinaw City
- Manistee
- Marquette
- Marshall
- Marysville
- Mason
- Milford
- Midland
- Montague
- Morenci
- Mount Clemens
- Muskegon
- Northville
- Novi
- Oak Park
- Petersburg
- Plainwell
- Port Huron
- Portage
- Portland
- Richland
- River Rouge
- Riverview
- Rochester Hills
- Royal Oak
- Roseville
- Saginaw
- St. Clair
- St. Clair Shores
- Saline
- Howell
- Saugatuck
- Shelby Charter Township
- South Haven
- South Lyon
- Southfield
- Southgate
- Sparta
- Spring Lake
- Sterling Heights
- Sturgis
- Taylor
- Tecumseh
- Traverse City
- Trenton
- Troy
- Wayne
- Westland
- Whitehall
- Zeeland

=== Minnesota ===
- Ada
- Chanhassen
- Eagan
- Eden Prairie
- Mahtomedi
- Minneapolis
- Minnetonka
- Rice
- Rochester
- Savage
- Wayzata

=== Mississippi ===
- Hattiesburg
- Laurel
- Ridgeland

=== Missouri ===
- Ellisville
- Hannibal
- Herculaneum
- Jackson
- Jefferson City
- Joplin
- Mexico
- Rolla
- St. Louis
- St. Peters
- Shrewsbury
- University City

=== Montana ===
- Billings
- Blackfeet Nation
- Bozeman
- Laurel
- Kalispell
- Montana State University (designated as a Tree Campus USA)
- Whitefish
- Whitehall

=== Nebraska ===
- Alliance
- Auburn
- Bellevue
- Boys Town
- Cozad
- Crete
- Gretna
- Grand Island
- Hastings
- Imperial
- Lincoln
- LaVista
- McCook
- Nebraska City
- Norfolk
- Offutt Air Force Base
- Omaha
- Papillion
- Ralston
- Scribner
- Seward
- Wakefield
- York
- Yutan

=== Nevada ===
- Boulder City
- Carson City
- Elko
- Ely
- Fallon Naval Air Station
- Gardnerville
- Genoa
- Henderson
- Incline Village
- Las Vegas
- Minden
- North Las Vegas
- Reno
- Sparks
- Winnemucca

=== New Hampshire ===
- Concord
- Dover
- Durham
- Enfield
- Exeter
- Franklin
- Hanover
- Keene
- Laconia
- Lebanon
- Manchester
- Nashua
- Newbury
- New London
- Plymouth
- Portsmouth
- Rochester
- Somersworth
- Wolfeboro

=== New Jersey ===
- Asbury Park
- Bayonne
- East Brunswick
- Hamilton Square
- Ho-Ho-Kus
- Kearny
- Leonia
- Madison
- Matawan
- Merchantville
- Morris Plains
- Nutley
- Paramus
- Parsippany–Troy Hills
- Princeton
- Riverton
- Secaucus
- South Orange Village
- Stafford Township
- Swedesboro
- Trenton
- Upper Saddle River

=== New Mexico ===
- Carlsbad
- Clovis
- Deming
- San Jon
- Santa Fe

=== New York ===
- Albany
- Amityville
- Attica
- Baxter Estates
- Beacon
- Bellerose
- Bergen
- Binghamton
- Brighton
- Brockport
- Brookhaven
- Buffalo
- Castleton-on-Hudson
- Cornwall
- DeWitt
- East Aurora
- East Rochester
- Ellicottville
- Floral Park
- Flower Hill
- Garden City
- Glens Falls
- Great Neck Estates
- Head of the Harbor
- Huntington
- Ithaca
- Irondequoit
- Jordan
- Lake George
- Lake George
- Lindenhurst
- Lynbrook
- Malverne
- Manorhaven
- Mount Vernon
- New Hyde Park
- New York City
- North Hempstead
- Norwich
- Nunda
- Oxford
- Pawling
- Rochester
- Rockville Centre
- Rye Brook
- Sands Point
- Scarsdale
- Smithtown
- Upper Brookville
- Walden
- Watertown
- Wellsville
- Westhampton Beach

=== North Carolina ===
- Apex
- Asheville
- Ayden
- Brevard
- Carrboro
- Cary
- Chapel Hill
- Charlotte
- Durham
- Edenton
- Farmville
- Hendersonville
- Jacksonville
- Laurinburg
- Marion
- Matthews
- Oak Island
- Raleigh
- Salisbury
- Southern Pines
- Southport
- Wake Forest
- Weaverville

=== North Dakota ===
- Arthur
- Bismarck
- Bottineau
- Cando
- Carrington
- Casselton
- Cavalier
- Cavalier Space Force Station
- Devils Lake
- Ellendale
- Fargo
- Garrison
- Grafton
- Gwinner
- Harvey
- Hatton
- Hazen
- Jamestown
- Lakota
- Langdon
- Lankin
- Larimore
- Lincoln
- Lisbon
- Mandan
- McVille
- Milnor
- Minot
- Mohall
- New Rockland
- Northwood
- Oakes
- Pekin
- Rugby
- Rutland
- Sibley
- Tower City
- Towner
- Valley City
- Wahpeton
- Walhalla
- Washburn
- West Fargo
- Wishek
- Wyndmere

=== Ohio ===
- Ada
- Akron
- Alliance
- Amberley
- Amsterdam
- Archbold
- Ashland
- Athens
- Attica
- Aurora
- Avon Lake
- Baltic
- Baltimore
- Bay Village
- Beachwood
- Bedford
- Bedford Heights
- Belle Center
- Bellefontaine
- Bellevue
- Bellville
- Belpre
- Berea
- Bexley
- Bloomdale
- Bloomville
- Bluffton
- Bolivar
- Bowling Green
- Brecksville
- Brewster
- Brooklyn
- Broadview Heights
- Brunswick
- Bryan
- Burton
- Celina
- Chillicothe
- Cincinnati
- Cleveland
- Cleveland Heights
- Coldwater
- Columbus
- Conneaut
- Dayton
- Delaware
- Dublin
- East Palestine
- Eastlake
- Fairfield
- Fairview Park
- Findlay
- Fremont
- Gambier
- Hamilton
- Hilliard
- Kent
- Kettering
- Lancaster
- Louisville
- Lakewood
- Loveland
- Montpelier
- Marietta
- New London
- North Baltimore
- Norwalk
- Oxford
- Parma Heights
- Perry
- Rocky River
- Springfield
- Tiffin
- Toledo
- Upper Arlington
- Urbana
- Vermilion
- Versailles
- Wapakoneta
- Westerville
- Wilmington
- Wooster
- Wyoming
- Youngstown
- Zanesville
- Zoar

=== Oklahoma ===
- Ada
- Altus AFB
- Bartlesville
- Bixby
- Broken Arrow
- Claremore
- Edmond
- Enid
- Guthrie
- Jenks
- Kingfisher
- McAlester
- Midwest City
- Morrison
- Muskogee
- Nichols Hills
- Norman
- Oklahoma City
- Pauls Valley
- Ponca City
- Shawnee
- Tinker AFB
- Tulsa
- Vance AFB

=== Oregon ===
- Albany
- Ashland
- Aumsville
- Baker City
- Bandon
- Banks
- Beaverton
- Bend
- Brownsville
- Cannon Beach
- Central Point
- Coburg
- Coos Bay
- Corvallis
- Cottage Grove
- Creswell
- Dallas
- Eagle Point
- Echo
- Eugene
- Falls City
- Forest Grove
- Gervais
- Grants Pass
- Gresham
- Halsey
- Happy Valley
- Hillsboro
- Hood River
- Independence
- Klamath Falls
- La Grande
- Lake Oswego
- Lebanon
- Lincoln City
- Madras
- McMinnville
- Medford
- Milwaukie
- Monmouth
- Newport
- Oregon City
- Pendleton
- Philomath
- Portland
- Redmond
- Rivergrove
- Rogue River
- Roseburg
- Salem
- Sandy
- Seaside
- Sherwood
- Sisters
- Stanfield
- Sunriver
- Sweet Home
- Talent
- Tigard
- Tillamook
- Toledo
- Troutdale
- Tualatin
- Sandy
- Umatilla
- Veneta
- West Linn
- Wilsonville

=== Pennsylvania ===
- Allentown
- Athens
- Beaver
- Bensalem
- Bernville
- Bethlehem
- Blairsville
- Bloomsburg
- Boyertown
- Carbondale
- Carlisle
- Chambersburg
- Cheltenham Township
- Clarks Green
- Clarks Summit
- Columbia
- Corry
- Crafton
- Denver
- Derry
- Doylestown
- Eagles Mere
- East Stroudsburg
- Easton
- Edinboro
- Emporium
- Erie
- Factoryville
- Forest Hills
- Fountain Hill
- Gratz
- Greensburg
- Hanover
- Harrisburg
- Highspire
- Hollidaysburg
- Hummelstown
- Huntingdon
- Jermyn
- Kingston
- Lancaster
- Lansdowne
- Laporte
- Lehighton
- Lemoyne
- Lewisburg
- Lower Merion
- Marcus Hook
- Meadville
- Media
- Mifflinburg
- Milford
- Moscow
- Mount Lebanon
- Muncy
- Nazareth
- Newtown
- Nicholson
- Oil City
- Olyphant
- Paxtang
- Philadelphia
- Pittsburgh
- Pottsville
- Radnor
- Reading
- Ridley Park
- Robesonia
- St. Mary's
- Sayre
- Schuylkill Haven
- Sheffield
- Shillington
- Shinglehouse
- South Williamsport
- Southmont
- Springfield
- State College
- Stroudsburg
- Summit Hill
- Swarthmore
- Titusville
- Tunkhannock
- Upper Darby Township
- Upper Dublin Township
- Upper Merion
- Warren
- Weatherly
- Wellsboro
- Wernersville
- West Chester
- West Pittston
- Westmont
- Whitemarsh Township
- Whitpain Township
- Wilkes-Barre
- Williamsport
- Wyalusing
- Wyomissing
- York

=== Rhode Island ===
- Barrington
- Bristol
- Central Falls
- East Providence
- Jamestown
- Middletown
- Narragansett
- Newport
- Pawtucket
- Portsmouth
- Providence
- Warren
- Warwick
- West Warwick

=== South Carolina ===
- Charleston
- Cheraw
- Columbia
- Conway
- Florence
- Hilton Head Island
- Port Royal
- Shaw AFB
- Tega Cay

=== South Dakota ===
- Aberdeen
- Brookings
- Dell Rapids
- Huron
- Lead
- Mitchell
- Pierre
- Rapid City
- Sioux Falls
- Yankton

=== Tennessee ===
- Alcoa
- Athens
- Bell Buckle
- Brentwood
- Bristol
- Clarksville
- Cleveland
- Collierville
- Cookeville
- Crossville
- Fairview
- Franklin
- Gatlinburg
- Germantown
- Harrogate
- Jackson
- Johnson City
- Jonesborough
- Kingsport
- Knoxville
- Lakeland
- Livingston
- Maryville
- McMinnville
- Morristown
- Chattanooga
- Nashville
- Norris
- Oak Ridge
- Pigeon Forge
- Pulaski
- Rogersville
- Sevierville
- Sewanee
- Sparta
- Sweetwater
- Tullahoma

=== Texas ===
- Addison
- Allen
- Anna
- Argyle
- Arlington
- Austin
- Azle
- Bastrop
- Boerne
- Brownsville
- Bryan
- Buda
- Burleson
- Cedar Hill
- Celina
- College Station
- Colleyville
- Conroe
- Coppell
- Cuero
- Dallas
- Denton
- DeSoto
- Duncanville
- El Paso
- Euless
- Fairview
- Farmers Branch
- Flower Mound
- Fort Cavazos
- Fort Worth
- Frisco
- Galveston
- Garland
- Grand Prairie
- Grapevine
- Greenville
- Haltom City
- Harker Heights
- Hedwig Village
- Hickory Creek
- Hollywood Park
- Houston
- Hutto
- Irving
- Justin
- Katy
- Keller
- Kennedale
- Killeen
- Lakeway
- Lancaster
- League City
- Leon Valley
- Lewisville
- Little Elm
- Live Oak
- Lufkin
- Manor
- Mansfield
- McAllen
- McKinney
- Mesquite
- Midlothian
- Muenster
- Murphy
- New Braunfels
- Odessa
- Pearland
- Pflugerville
- Pharr
- Piney Point Village
- Plano
- Prosper
- Rockport
- Rowlett
- Sachse
- San Antonio
- Shady Shores
- Shavano Park
- Shenandoah
- Southlake
- Sugar Land
- Sunset Valley
- Taylor
- Temple
- The Colony
- Trophy Club
- Tyler
- University Park
- Waco
- West University Place
- Woodcreek
- Wylie

=== Utah ===
- Grantsville
- Highland
- Hurricane
- Murray
- Oak City
- Springville

=== Vermont ===
- Burlington
- Essex Junction
- Hartford
- Rutland
- Shelburne

=== Virginia ===
- Abingdon
- Alexandria
- Berryville
- City of Fairfax
- Falls Church
- Herndon
- Leesburg
- Lynchburg
- Marion
- Purcellville
- Reston
- Virginia Beach
- Warrenton

=== Washington ===
- Airway Heights
- Anacortes
- Arlington
- Auburn
- Bainbridge Island
- Bellevue
- Bellingham
- Bonney Lake
- Bothell
- Bremerton
- Burien
- Cashmere
- Centralia
- Chelan
- Cheney
- City of College Place
- Clyde Hill
- Colfax
- Colville
- Connell
- Coulee Dam
- Covington
- Dupont
- Duvall
- Edmonds
- Ellensburg
- Entiat
- Enumclaw
- Everett
- Fairchild AFB
- Fairfield
- Fife
- George
- Grandview
- Hoquiam
- Issaquah
- Kennewick
- Kent
- Kirkland
- Lacey
- Lake Forest Park
- Longview
- Lynnwood
- Medina
- Mercer Island
- Millwood
- Monroe
- Mountlake Terrace
- Newcastle
- North Bend
- Oak Harbor
- Okanogan
- Olympia
- Omak
- Oroville
- Pasco
- Pateros
- Port Angeles
- Port Townsend
- Poulsbo
- Pullman
- Redmond
- Renton
- Richland
- Ritzville
- Rockford
- Sea Tac
- Seattle
- Sequim
- Shoreline
- Snoqualmie
- Spokane
- Steilacoom
- Sumner
- Tacoma
- Tonasket
- Town of Friday Harbor
- Town of Hunts Point
- Tukwila
- Tumwater
- Twisp
- University Place
- Vancouver
- Walla Walla
- Waterville
- Wenatchee
- White Salmon
- Woodinville
- Woodland
- Woodway
- Yakima
- Yarrow Point
- Yelm

=== West Virginia ===
- Berkeley Springs
- Bluefield
- Charles Town
- Charleston
- Elkins
- Follansbee
- Harpers Ferry
- Hinton
- Lewisburg
- Moorefield
- Morgantown
- Parkersburg
- Petersburg
- Ronceverte
- Shepherdstown
- Summersville
- Wheeling
- Williamstown

=== Wisconsin ===
- Appleton
- Beloit
- Cedarburg
- Eau Claire
- Edgar
- Edgerton
- Fitchburg
- Fort McCoy
- Fox Point
- Greenfield
- Janesville
- Kenosha
- La Crosse
- Madison
- Milton
- Milwaukee
- Oconomowoc
- Plymouth
- Sturgeon Bay
- Thiensville
- Two Rivers
- Waukesha
- Wauwatosa

=== Wyoming ===
- Cheyenne
- Green River
- Laramie

=== Districts and territories ===
==== District of Columbia ====
- Washington

==== Puerto Rico ====
- Caguas

== See also ==
- Tree Cities of the World
