= Tree Line USA =

Tree Line USA logo

Tree Line USA is a program sponsored by the Arbor Day Foundation in cooperation with the National Association of State Foresters which recognizes public and private utilities across the United States that demonstrate best practices that protect and enhance America's urban forests.

== Goal ==
The goal is to promote the dual goals of dependable utility service and abundant, healthy trees in America's communities. Certain criteria have been developed for the public and utility workers that highlight key practices that need to be followed. Utilities that meet the requirements of this program are publicly recognized for their contribution to better community forests. This recognition serves not only as an award to the employees, but also makes a statement about cooperation, goodwill and the need for continuous tree care.

== Requirements ==
=== Quality tree care ===
A utility must have practices in place for tree pruning similar to methods prescribed by Dr. Alex L. Shigo and keeping in compliance with ANSI A300 that include avoiding tree topping, tree tipping, removing branch collars and leaving long stubs. Workers who perform line clearance, including contractor workers, must read and understand Dr. Shigo's field guide (or an equivalent one approved by the State Forester and the Foundation), follows its recommendations, and has a copy at every work site for quick reference.

For trenching and tunneling near trees, it is recommended workers follow methods in Dr. James R. Fazio's field guide to reduce the destruction of roots and injury to trees. The utility must provide educational information to its underground workers on proper trenching and tunneling.

=== Annual worker training ===
Annual documented training on following the work practices is carried out for all employees, contractor workers and supervisors who do pruning work for the utility. An arborist, forester or other trained utility employee is designated by the utility to ensure that the training takes place and that the work practices are followed.

=== Tree planting and care ===
The city must have an ongoing community tree-planting program which is sponsored by the utility. Utility employees may plant the trees, or the utility may fund tree planting by municipalities, volunteer groups or homeowners. It is suggested the utility work toward an annual expenditure of at least 10 cents per customer.

=== Energy conservation program ===
Also, educational information about trees (one or more mailings) are made annually to all homeowner customers and include appropriate tree species for planting near utility lines. How to create energy-efficient landscapes to reduce cooling and heating loads and tips on how to prune trees safely.

=== Arbor Day celebration ===
The municipality must have annual Arbor Day events which are sponsored by, or participated in, by the utility.

== Award ==
Utilities which apply and are certified as a Tree Line USA will receive a plaque, a Tree Line USA flag and, the distinctive Tree Line USA prism for display.
