= Arbor Day Foundation =

U.S. nonprofit that encourages tree planting

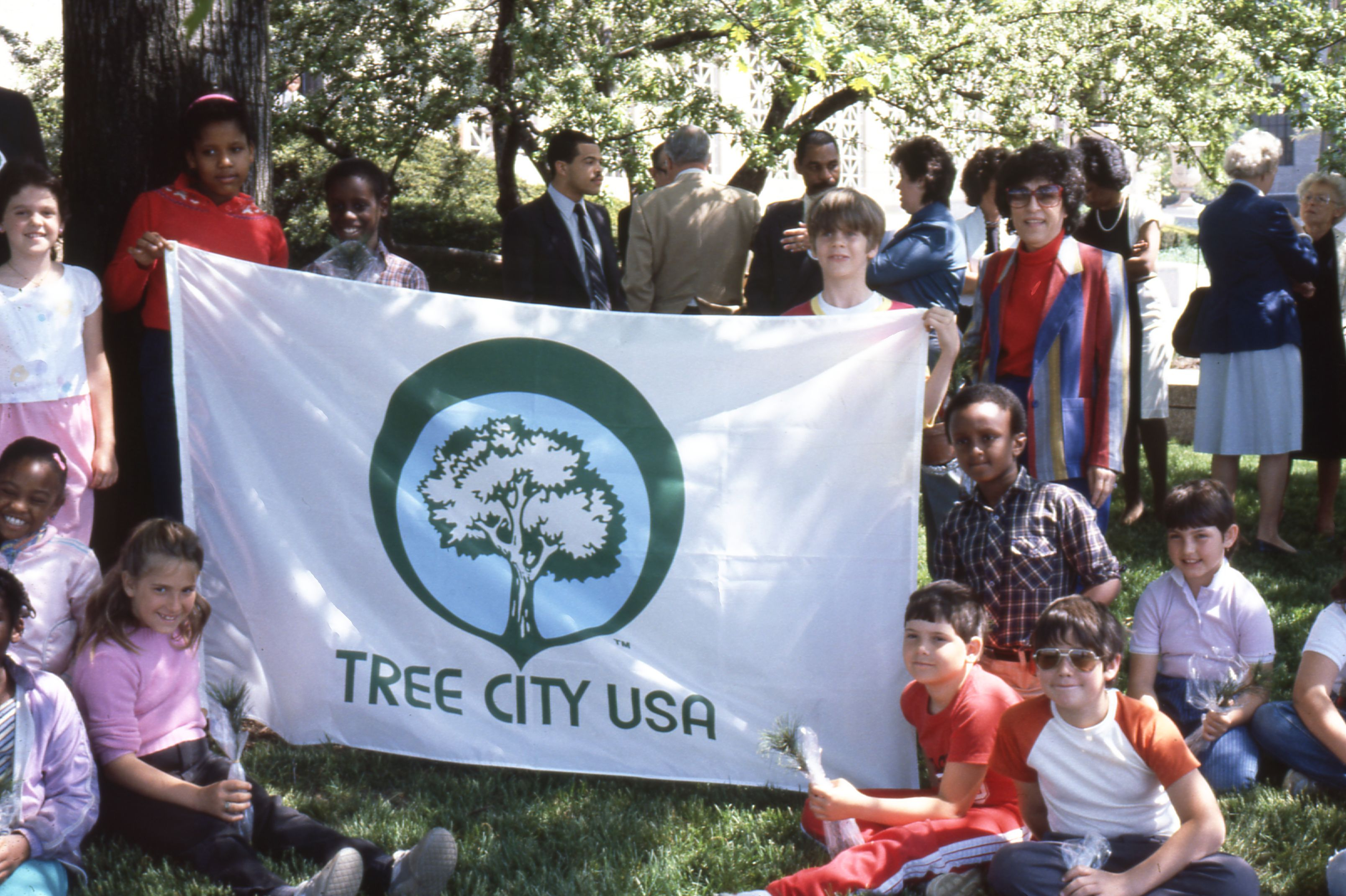
- Tree City USA Event, Columbus City Hall, Ohio
- Founded: 1972 (54 years ago)
- Founder: John Rosenow
- Type: 501(c)(3) non-profit
- Purpose: Tree planting; Environmental conservation
- Headquarters: Lincoln, Nebraska, United States
- Region served: Global
- Members: 1 million
- Chief Executive Officer: Dan Lambe
- Key people: Leslie Weldon, Board Chair
- Revenue: $84 million
- Website: www.arborday.org
- Remarks: Approximately 5 million trees planted in America's forests per year.

The Arbor Day Foundation is an American 501(c)(3) nonprofit membership organization dedicated to planting trees. Headquartered in Lincoln, Nebraska, United States, the Arbor Day Foundation has more than one million members and has planted more than 500 million trees in neighborhoods, communities, cities and forests throughout the world. The Foundation's stated mission is "to inspire people to plant, nurture, and celebrate trees."

== History ==
The Arbor Day Foundation was founded in 1972, the centennial of the first Arbor Day observance (1872). John Rosenow founded the organization to plant trees and educate the public on their importance. Throughout the years the organization has evolved into a global symbol of conservation with a variety of programs aimed at "inspiring people to plant, nurture, and celebrate trees."

== Programs ==
Through the global reforestation program, the Arbor Day Foundation and international partners have replanted more than 108 million trees lost to fire, insects, disease, and weather in forests in the United States and around the world. These rejuvenated forests help to protect watersheds, stabilize soil, restore wildlife habitats, improve air quality and create jobs.

=== Tree City USA ===
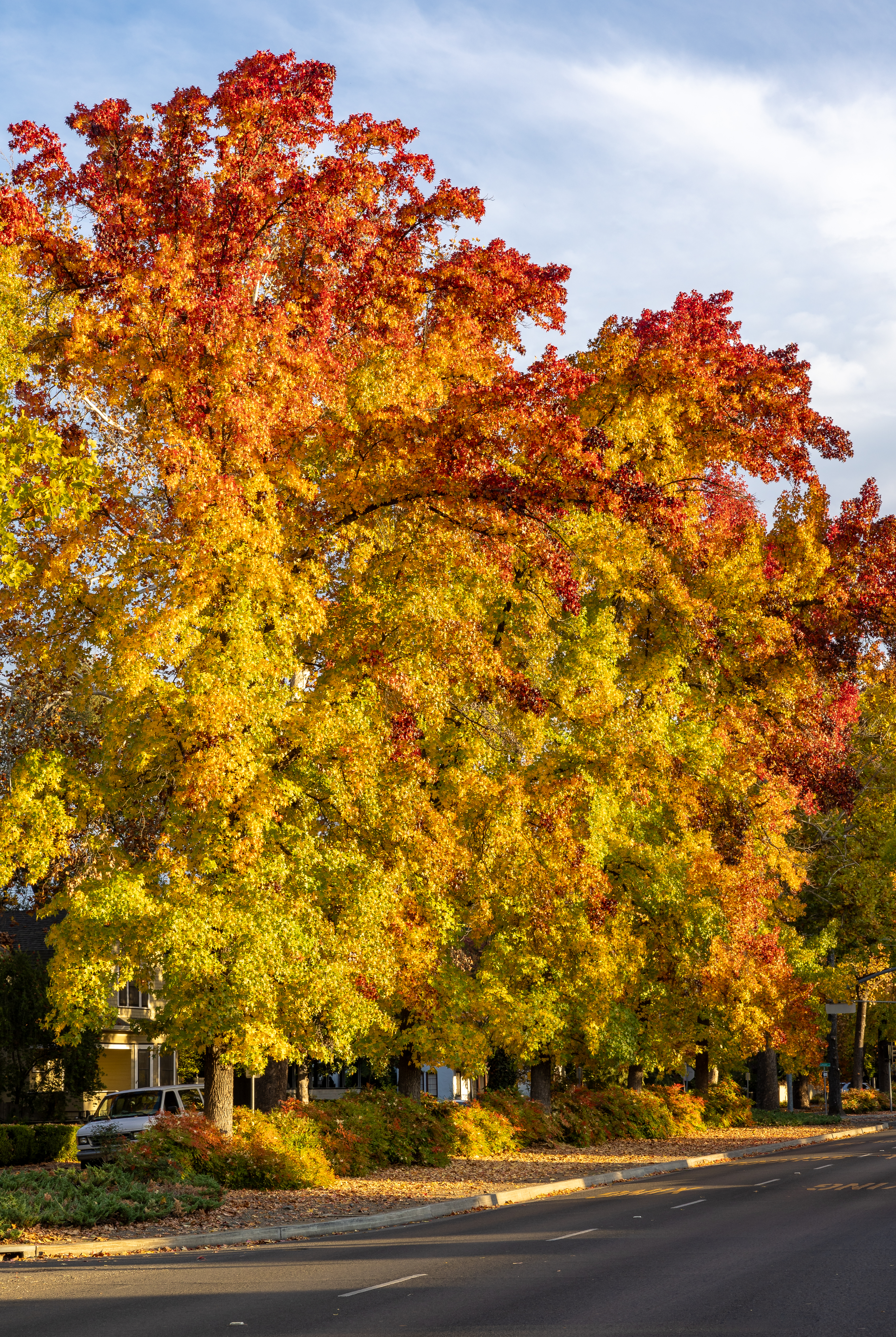
Trees in Chico, one of the designated tree cities in the United States.

Founded in 1976 and co-sponsored by the National Association of State Foresters and the United States Forest Service, the Tree City USA program provides a framework for communities to manage and expand their public trees. More than 3,900 communities have achieved Tree City USA status by meeting four core standards of sound urban forestry management: maintaining a tree board or department, having a community tree ordinance, spending at least $2 per capita on urban forestry and celebrating Arbor Day. Today, in all fifty states, Washington, D.C., and Puerto Rico nearly half of Americans are living in Tree City USA towns and cities.

=== Time for Trees ===
In 2018, the Arbor Day Foundation launched the Time for Trees initiative to plant 500 million trees in forests and communities around the world and engage 5 million tree planters by the 50th Anniversary of the Foundation in 2022. This ambitious goal was successfully achieved, marking a powerful milestone in celebration of the Arbor Day Foundation's 50th anniversary. Related to this initiative, was the publication of the book, "Now is the Time for Trees," by CEO of the Arbor Day Foundation, Dan Lambe. This book helps readers understand the importance of trees and learn how they can get involved in tree-planting.

=== Team Trees ===
In 2019, Team Trees was formed when YouTube creators MrBeast and Mark Rober joined with the Arbor Day Foundation to raise $20 million to plant 20 million trees. The campaign crowdfunded $20 million in 56 days. More than 800,000 people donated from 200 countries and territories. The campaign set the record for the biggest YouTube collaboration and fundraiser in history with notable donors such as Elon Musk and Tobias Lütke, who each donated over a million dollars. The goal to reach 20,000,000 trees was reached on December 19, 2019. and as of August 2025, #TeamTrees has raised $24.9 million.

=== Arbor Day Farm ===
Arbor Day Farm is a 260-acre attraction located in Nebraska City, Nebraska, where the mission of the Arbor Day Foundation comes to life. Amenities at Arbor Day Farm include a 140-room hotel (Lied Lodge), outdoor play and educational center (Tree Adventure), the historic home of Julius Sterling Morton (Arbor Lodge State Park) and many more amenities designed to immerse patrons into the outdoors and the beauty of trees. The farm also hosts community events, including the AppleJack Festival.

=== Arbor Day Carbon ===
Arbor Day Carbon, a wholly owned subsidiary of the Arbor Day Foundation, was founded in 2021. Arbor Day Carbon works with corporations and developers to advance high-integrity, nature-based carbon removal projects and accelerate global reforestation efforts. As of March 10, 2025, Arbor Day Carbon had retired more forestry carbon credits on the American Carbon Registry than any other nonprofit (over 1.6 million).

=== Arbor Day Impact Fund ===
In 2024, the Arbor Day Foundation launched the Arbor Day Impact Fund. A venture capital firm that invests in founders and startups related to environmental causes. This was done in an effort to boost and fund innovation in the tree-planting and climate solution spaces. In 2025, the Impact Fund invested in Funga PBC, an innovative climate start-up that combines the use of advanced data analytics, DNA sequencing and fungal communities to revitalize landscapes and soil. Initial results have shown that Funga's methods can increase survival rate and increase tree growth by an average of 30%.

=== Water Stewardship ===
The Arbor Day Foundation has recently expanded its offerings to include water stewardship initiatives. CEO Dan Lambe emphasized the connection, stating, "Water and trees are two natural resources that are inextricably linked. In order to protect water health, we must protect tree health." The Arbor Day Foundation uses trees to play a vital role in filtering pollutants and recharging underground aquifers. The Arbor Day Foundation has worked with various corporations to help them reach their water stewardship goals, including Niagara Bottling.

=== Tree Line USA ===
Tree Line USA is a program sponsored by the Arbor Day Foundation in cooperation with the National Association of State Foresters which recognizes public and private utilities across the United States that demonstrate best practices that protect and enhance America's urban forests.

== Gallery ==
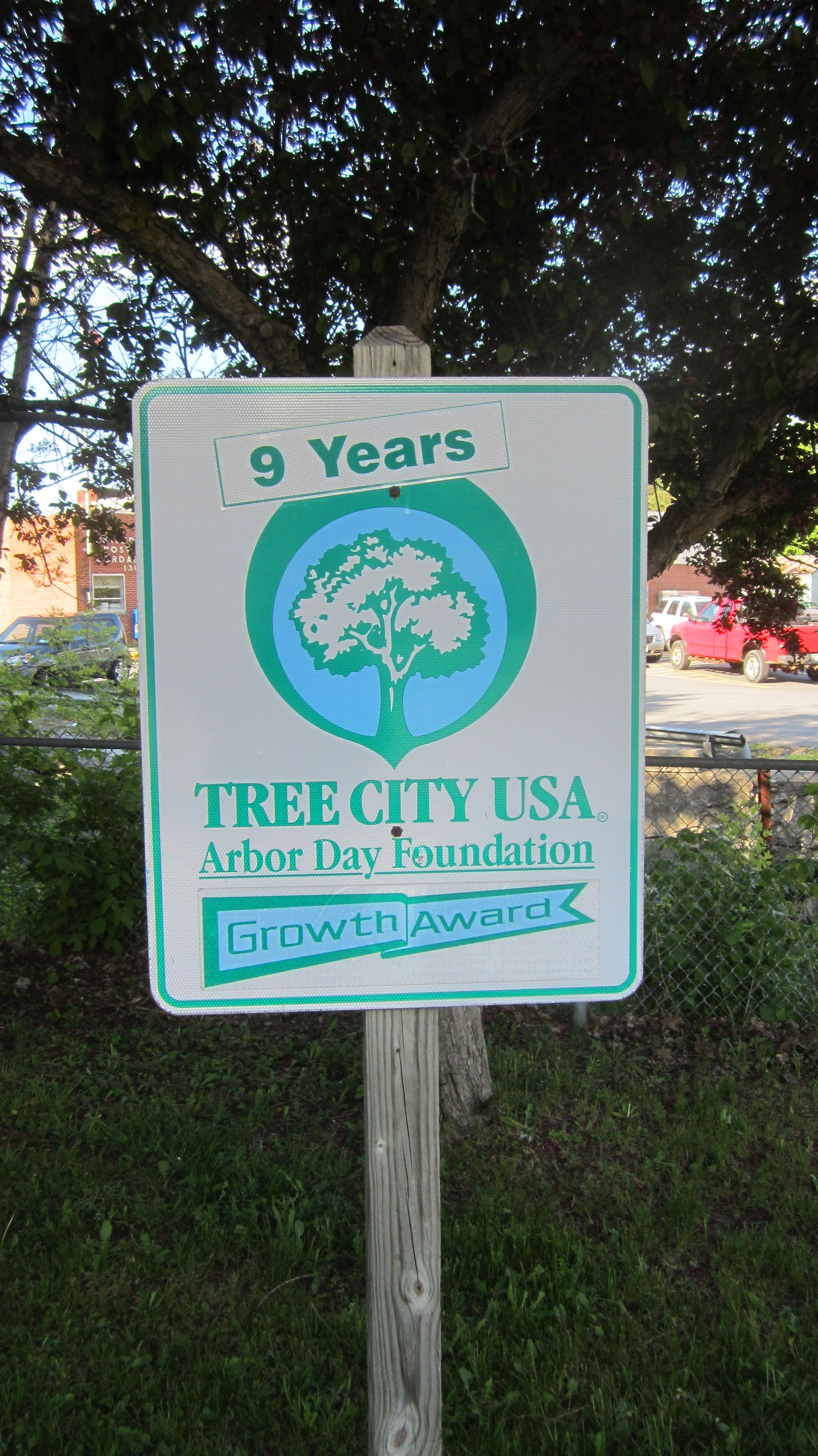
Tree City USA Growth Award sign in Onondaga County, New York

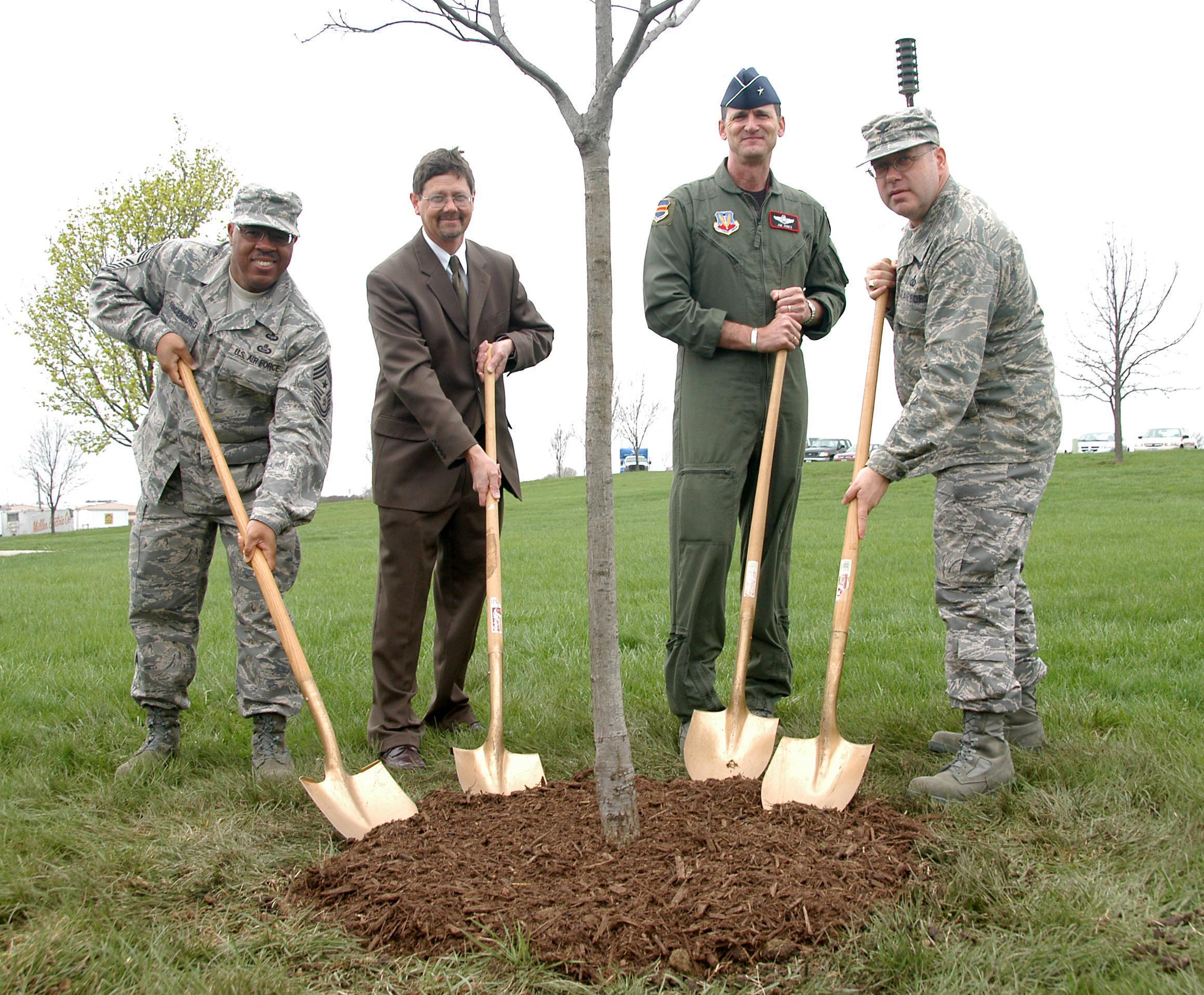
Offutt Air Force Base has been named Tree City USA for the last 20 years by the Arbor Day Foundation.

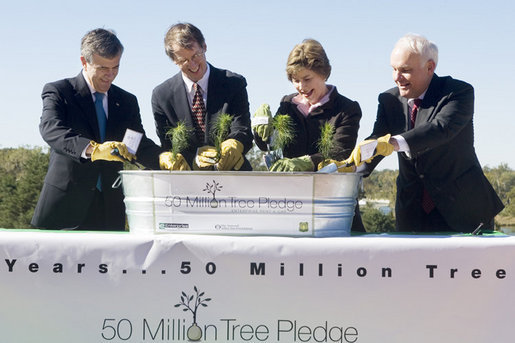
Mrs. Laura Bush is joined by, from left, U.S. Department of Agriculture Secretary Mike Johanns; John Rosenow, president of the National Arbor Day Foundation, and Andy Taylor, chairman and CEO of Enterprise, for the 50 Million Tree Pledge.

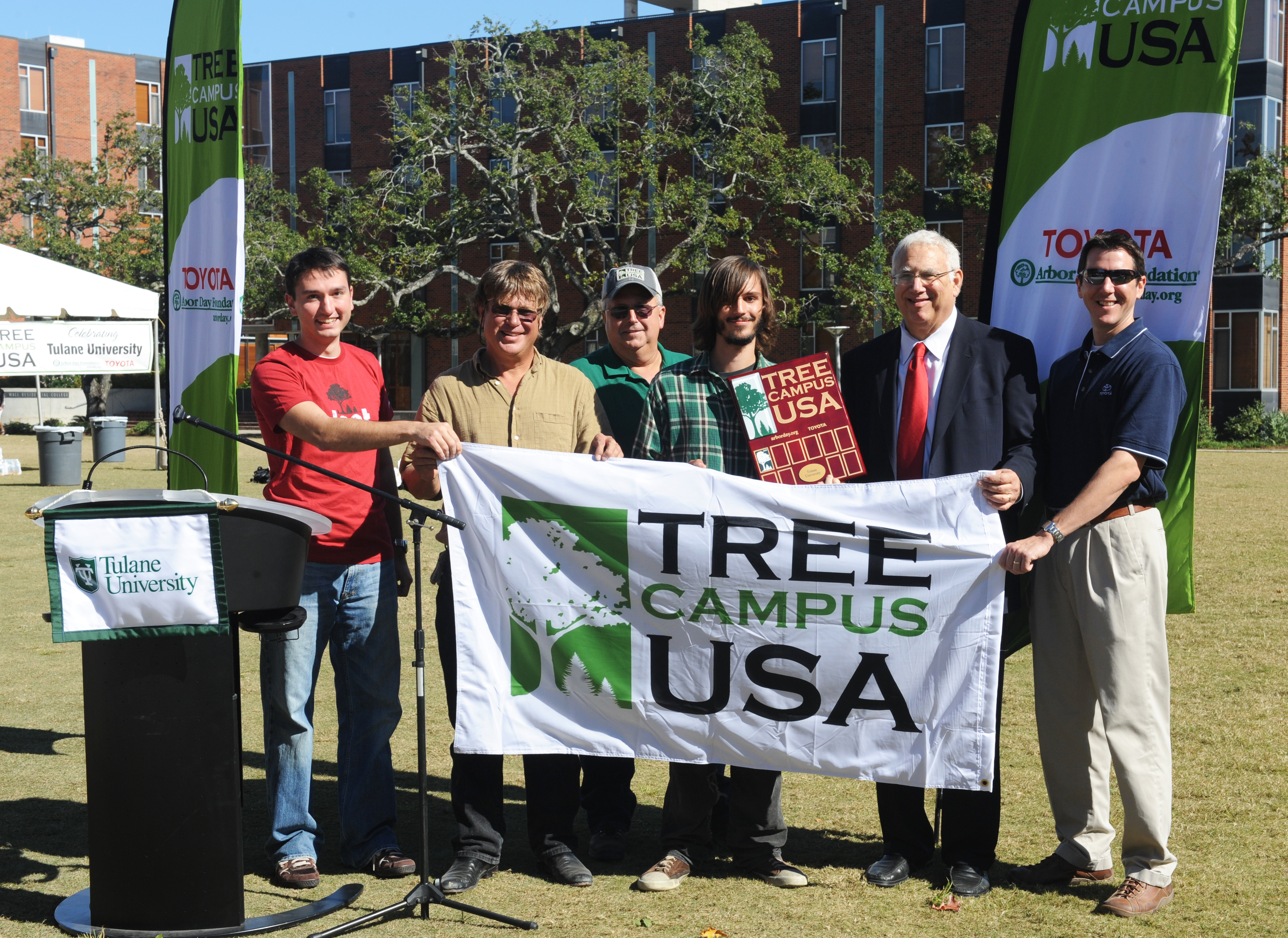
Arbor Day Foundation event for Tulane University as a Tree Campus USA

== See also ==
- List of Tree Cities USA
- Arbor Day
- International Day of Forests
- Britain in Bloom
- Entente Florale
- Reforestation
