= Yana Mintoff =

Maltese politician and activist (born 1951)

Yana Bland
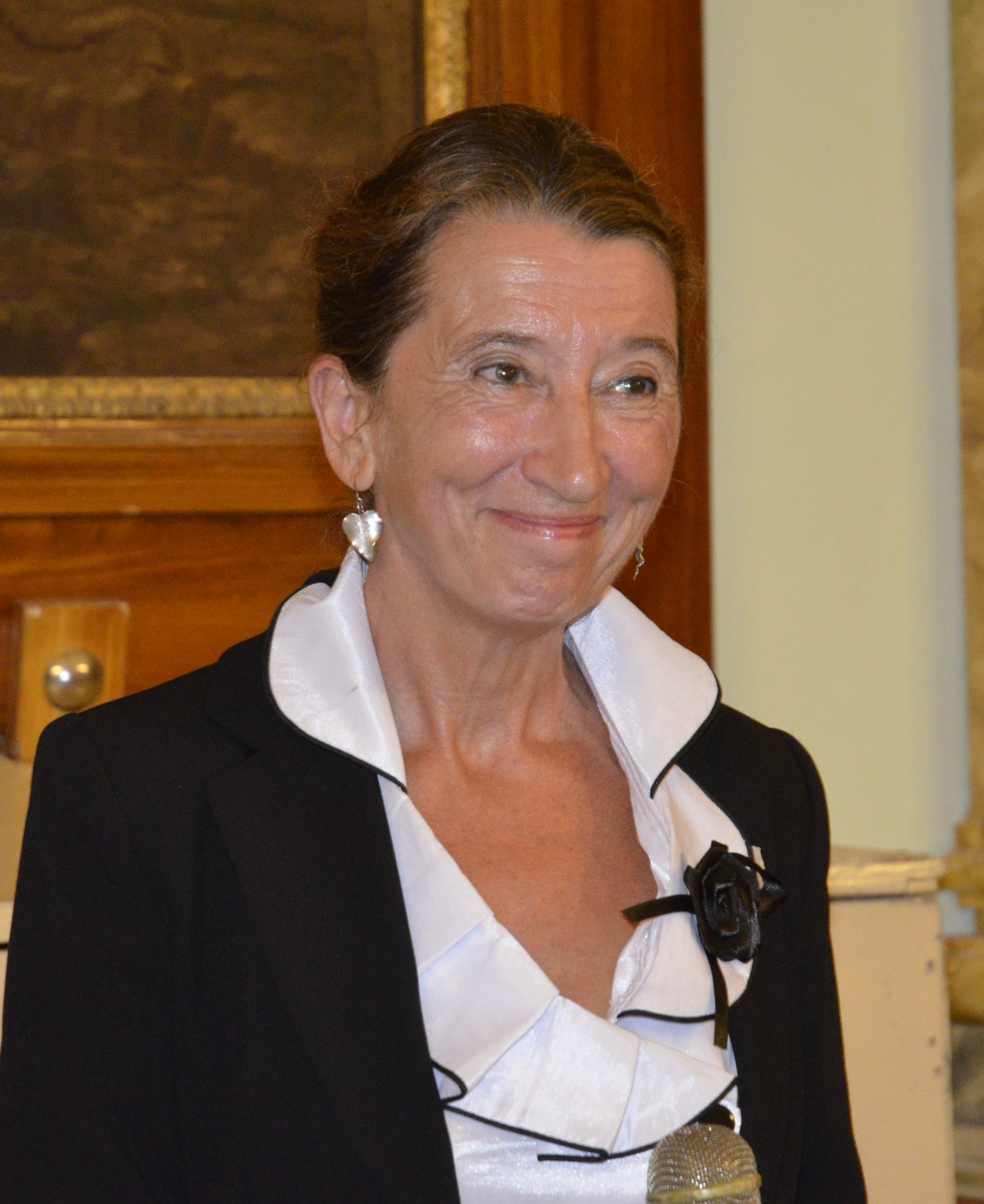

Personal details
- Born: Yana Joan Mintoff; 21 August 1951 (age 74) Crown Colony of Malta
- Party: Labour Party
- Spouse: David P. Bland
- Children: 2
- Occupation: Politician, economist and educator

Yana Bland or Yana Bland Mintoff (née Yana Joan Mintoff) is a Maltese Labour politician, economist and educator. Mintoff was born on 21 August 1951, the daughter of the former Prime Minister of Malta, Dom Mintoff and Moyra De Vere Bentinck, by whom she is descended from both Dutch and British nobility.

== Career ==
Whilst a teacher in the United Kingdom, Yana Mintoff was a member of the Socialist Workers Party. On 6 July 1978 Mintoff took part in a demonstration in the UK House of Commons; in a protest against the presence of UK troops in Northern Ireland, three bags of horse manure were hurled from the public gallery during a debate on Scottish devolution.

On her return to Malta, she helped establish the Association of Women of the Mediterranean Region. Mintoff helped compile four books of collected works.

In the US in 1998, Mintoff was a founder and superintendent of the Katherine Anne Porter School, a charter school in Wimberley.

Having returned to Malta to tend to her ailing father, Mintoff addressed the Maltese Labour Party's General Conference of 2012. She was a candidate in the 2013 Maltese general election, but failed to get elected to the House of Representatives.

== Family ==
Mintoff's first husband was Geoff Mainwaring. Her second husband was David P. Bland whom she married in 1991.

After the couple separated, Mintoff formed a relationship with Gheorghe Popa.
