= Woodcreek, Texas =

- City
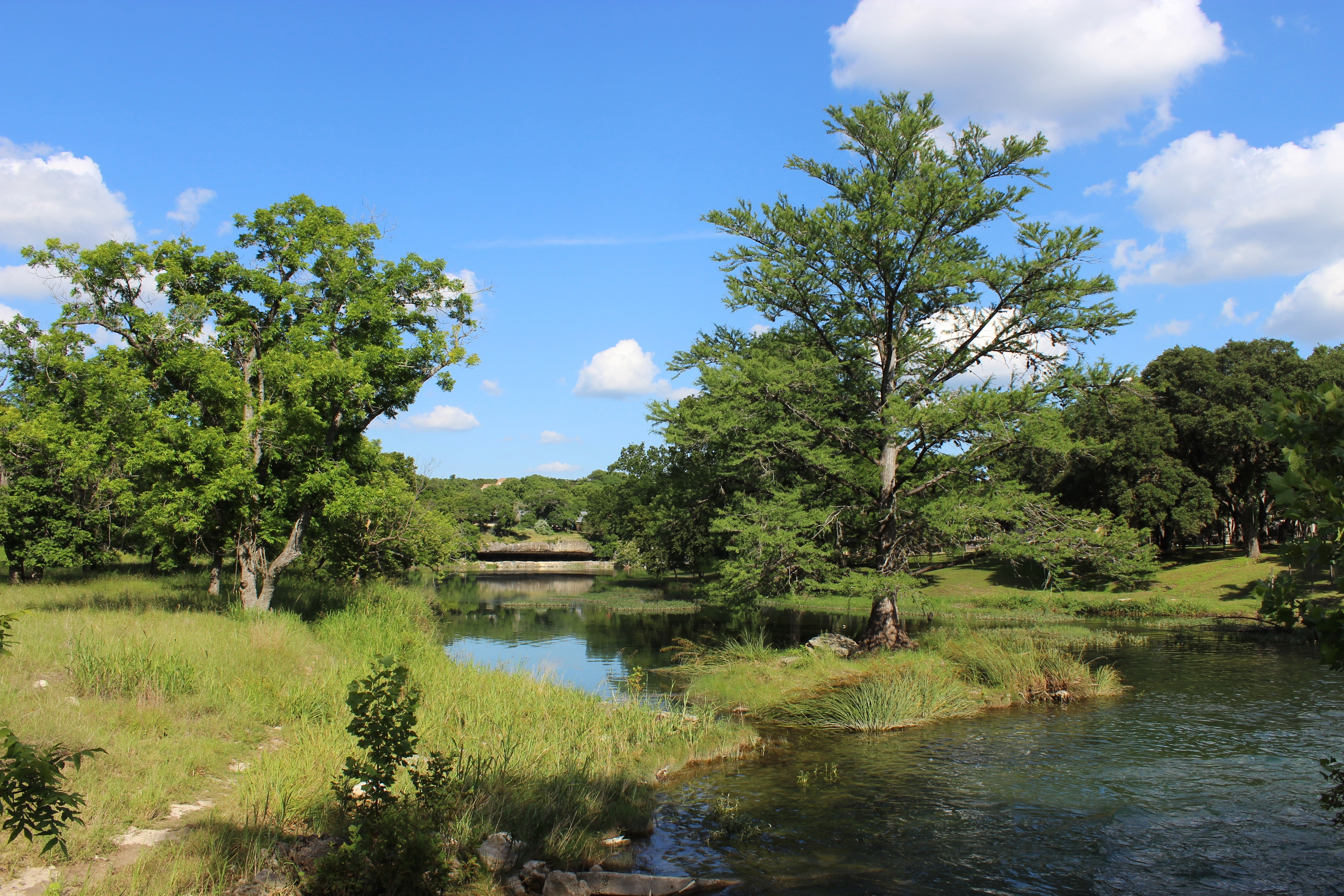
- Woodcreek as viewed from a bridge crossing Cypress Creek

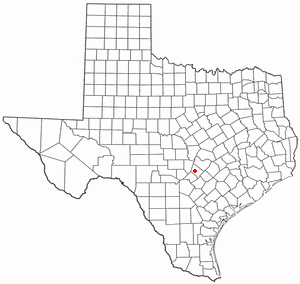
- Location of Woodcreek, Texas

- Coordinates: 30°01′36″N 98°06′41″W
- Country: United States
- State: Texas
- County: Hays
- Incorporated: 1984

Area
  - Total: 1.08 sq mi (2.81 km^{2})
  - Land: 1.08 sq mi (2.81 km^{2})
  - Water: 0 sq mi (0.00 km^{2})
- Elevation: 955 ft (291 m)

Population (2020)
  - Total: 1,770
  - Density: 1,630/sq mi (630/km^{2})
- Time zone: UTC-6 (Central (CST))
  - Summer (DST): UTC-5 (CDT)
- ZIP code: 78676
- Area code: 512
- FIPS code: 48-80058
- GNIS feature ID: 2412297
- Website: woodcreektx.gov

Woodcreek is a city in Hays County, Texas, United States. Like its neighbor of Wimberley, Woodcreek is a primarily a retirement community. The population was 1,770 at the 2020 census.

== Geography ==
Woodcreek is located in western Hays County. The city is 2 miles (3 km) north of Wimberley, 34 miles (55 km) southwest of Austin and 60 miles (97 km) northeast of San Antonio.

According to the United States Census Bureau, the city has a total area of 1.1 square miles (2.8 km^{2}), all land. Cypress Creek, a tributary of the Blanco River, forms the western boundary of the city.

== Demographics ==
Historical population
| Census | Pop. | Note | %± |
|---|---|---|---|
| 1990 | 889 | | — |
| 2000 | 1,274 | | 43.3% |
| 2010 | 1,457 | | 14.4% |
| 2020 | 1,770 | | 21.5% |
U.S. Decennial Census; 2020 Census

=== 2020 census ===
As of the 2020 census, Woodcreek had a population of 1,770. The median age was 57.4 years. 17.1% of residents were under the age of 18 and 36.7% of residents were 65 years of age or older. For every 100 females there were 83.4 males, and for every 100 females age 18 and over there were 78.4 males age 18 and over.

0.0% of residents lived in urban areas, while 100.0% lived in rural areas.

There were 830 households in Woodcreek, of which 21.7% had children under the age of 18 living in them. Of all households, 49.9% were married-couple households, 12.5% were households with a male householder and no spouse or partner present, and 34.2% were households with a female householder and no spouse or partner present. About 33.7% of all households were made up of individuals and 23.3% had someone living alone who was 65 years of age or older.

There were 910 housing units, of which 8.8% were vacant. The homeowner vacancy rate was 1.8% and the rental vacancy rate was 10.7%.

Racial composition as of the 2020 census
| Race | Number | Percent |
|---|---|---|
| White | 1,590 | 89.8% |
| Black or African American | 0 | 0.0% |
| American Indian and Alaska Native | 9 | 0.5% |
| Asian | 7 | 0.4% |
| Native Hawaiian and Other Pacific Islander | 0 | 0.0% |
| Some other race | 25 | 1.4% |
| Two or more races | 139 | 7.9% |
| Hispanic or Latino (of any race) | 176 | 9.9% |

=== 2000 census ===
As of the census of 2000, there were 1,274 people, 588 households, and 415 families residing in the city. The population density was 1,204.7 inhabitants per square mile (465.1/km^{2}). There were 638 housing units at an average density of 603.3 per square mile (232.9/km^{2}). The racial makeup of the city was 97.65% White, 0.16% African American, 0.24% Native American, 0.24% Asian, 0.47% from other races, and 1.26% from two or more races. Hispanic or Latino of any race were 1.96% of the population.

There were 588 households, out of which 19.7% had children under the age of 18 living with them, 64.8% were married couples living together, 4.6% had a female householder with no husband present, and 29.3% were non-families. 26.5% of all households were made up of individuals, and 16.2% had someone living alone who was 65 years of age or older. The average household size was 2.17 and the average family size was 2.58.

In the city, the population was spread out, with 16.7% under the age of 18, 3.1% from 18 to 24, 16.9% from 25 to 44, 30.3% from 45 to 64, and 33.0% who were 65 years of age or older. The median age was 55 years. For every 100 females, there were 81.5 males. For every 100 females age 18 and over, there were 79.2 males.

The median income for a household in the city was $52,986, and the median income for a family was $60,703. Males had a median income of $50,893 versus $29,500 for females. The per capita income for the city was $32,893. About 1.5% of families and 2.5% of the population were below the poverty line, including 1.3% of those under age 18 and 1.8% of those age 65 or over.

== Education ==
Woodcreek is served by the Wimberley Independent School District.
