= Jacob's Well (Texas) =

Perennial karstic spring in the Texas Hill Country

Coordinates: 30°2′4″N 98°7′34″W

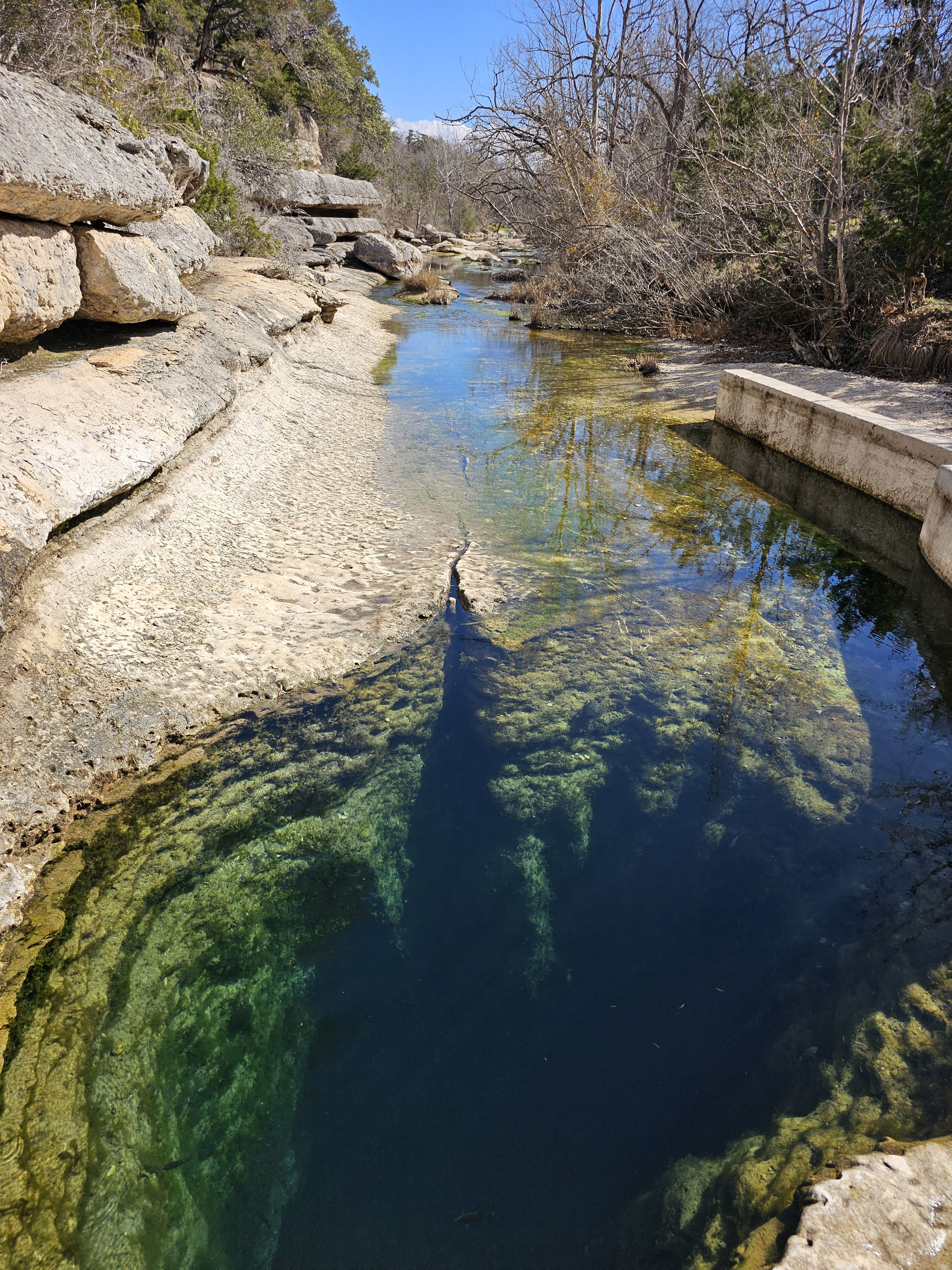
Jacob's Well

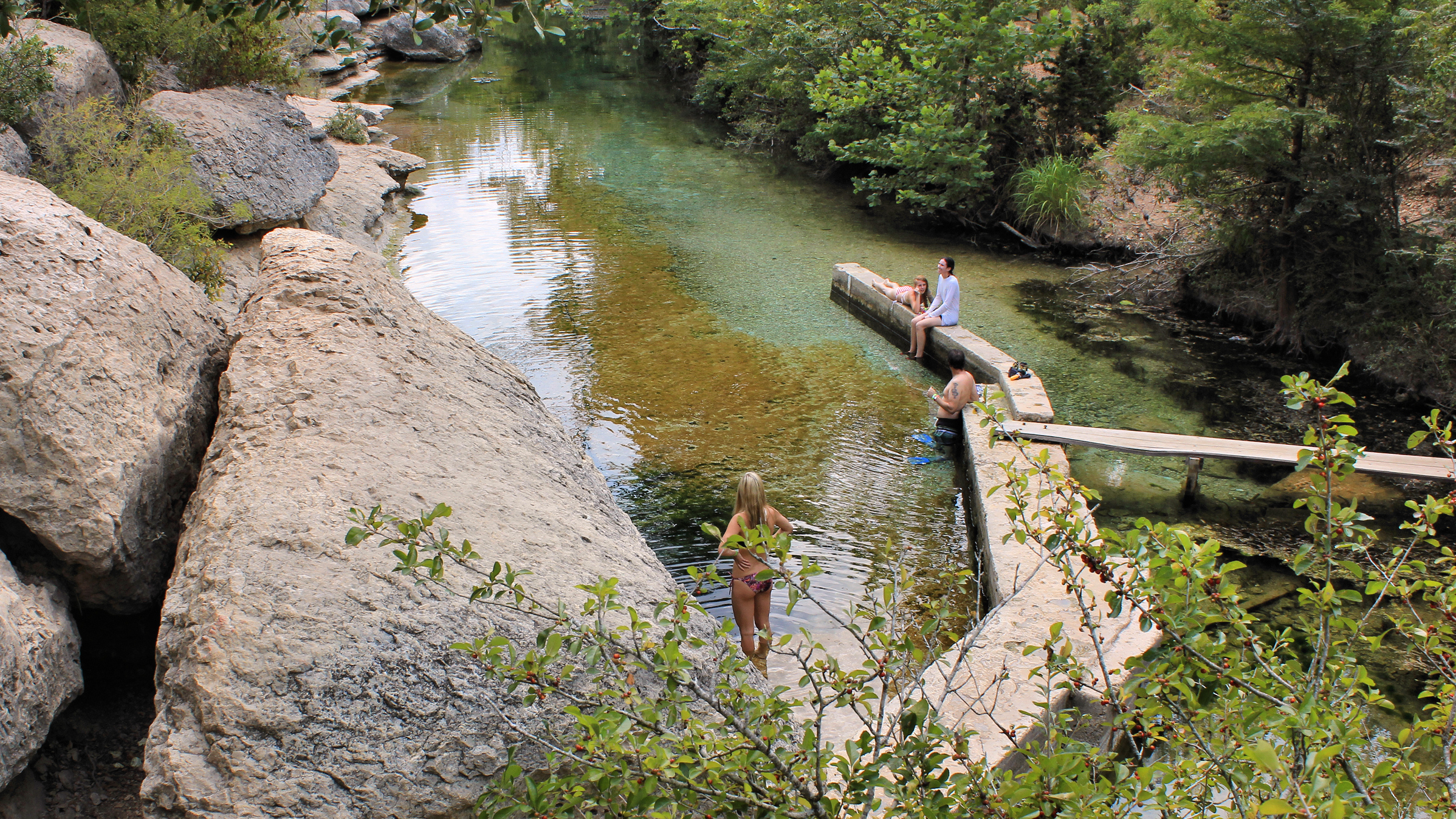
Jacob's Well and its surroundings.

Jacob's Well is a perennial karstic spring in the Texas Hill Country flowing from the bed of Cypress Creek, located northwest of Wimberley, Texas.

== Description ==
The spring is located on the property of Jacob's Well Natural Area (JWNA), managed by the Hays County Parks Department. The visitor entrance for JWNA is located at 1699 Mt. Sharp Road in Wimberley, Texas. The 12-foot (3.7 m) diameter mouth of the spring serves as a popular local swimming spot. From the opening in the creek bed, Jacob's Well cave descends vertically for about 30 feet (9.1 m), then continues downward at an angle through a series of silted chambers separated by narrow restrictions, finally reaching an average depth of 120 feet (37 m). Until the modern era, the Trinity Aquifer-fed natural artesian spring gushed water from the mouth of the cave, with a measured flow in 1924 of 170 US gallons per second (640 L/s), discharging 6 feet (1.8 m) into the air.

Excessive pumping to meet supply demands by Aqua Texas (a subsidiary of Essential Utilities) has lowered the level of the Trinity Aquifer, affecting the flow of water through Jacob's Well. In the modern era, what remains visible of the spring is a faint ripple on the surface of Cypress Creek. The spring ceased flowing for the first time in recorded history in 2000, again ceasing to flow in 2008, 2011, 2013 and 2022. This resulted in now ongoing measures to address local water conservation and quality. Hays County purchased 50 acres (20 ha) of land around Jacob's Well in 2010, in an attempt to protect the spring from development. An additional thirty-one acres was transferred to the county from the neighboring Jacob's Well Natural Area (administered at the time by the Wimberley Valley Watershed Association (WVWA)), the new, eighty-acre (32 hectares) named the Westridge Tract.

=== Caves and diving ===
The system has been explored and mapped by cave divers of the Jacob's Well Exploration Project and has been shown to consist of two principal conduits. One passageway measures approximately 4,500 feet (1,400 m) from the surface with a maximum depth of 137 feet (42 m), and a secondary one extends approximately 1,000 feet (300 m) in length from the point where it diverges from the main conduit.

The cave is also an attraction for open-water divers, some of whom are inexperienced with the specialized techniques and equipment used in cave diving, which has resulted in nine fatalities at this site between 1964 and 1984 (eight men and one woman).
