= Wimberley High School =

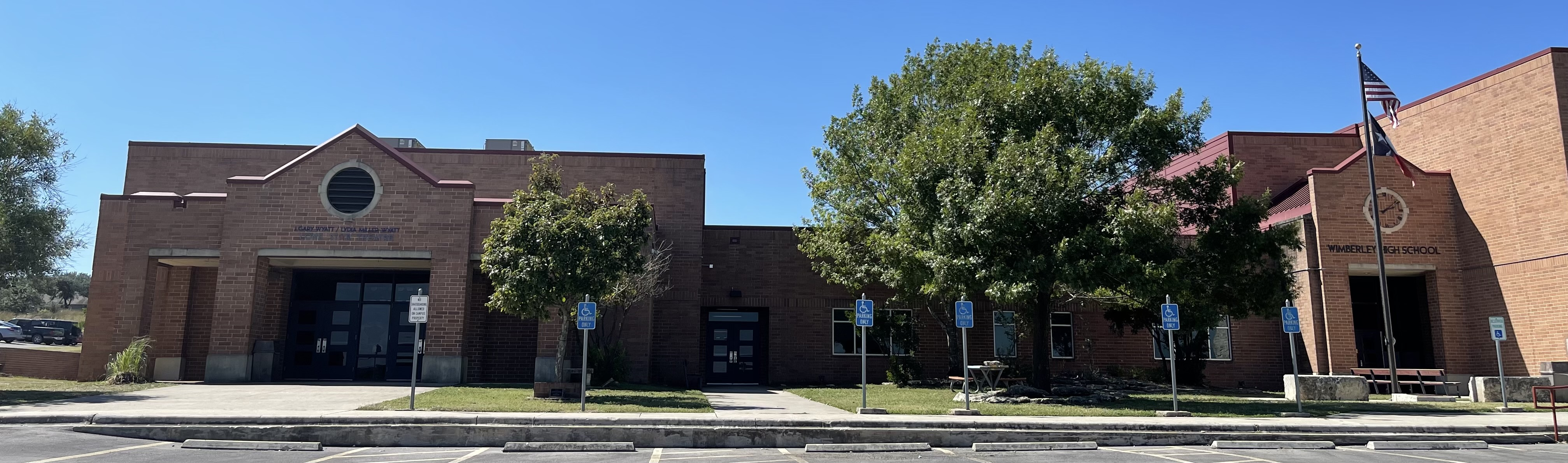

Location
- 100 Carney Lane; Wimberley, Texas 78676-4922; United States; 30.005042°N 98.117116°W

Information
- School type: Public high school
- School district: Wimberley Independent School District
- Principal: Ryan Wilkes
- Teaching staff: 62.24 (FTE)
- Grades: 9-12
- Enrollment: 859 (2025–2026)
- Student to teacher ratio: 13.72
- Colors: Red, White & Blue
- Athletics conference: UIL Class 4A
- Website: Wimberley High School website

Wimberley High School is a public high school located in Wimberley, Texas (USA). It is part of the Wimberley Independent School District located in northwestern Hays County and classified as a 4A school by the UIL. In 2015, the school was rated "Met Standard" by the Texas Education Agency.

== Academics ==
- UIL Academic State Meet Champions -
  - 1993(2A)

== Athletics ==
The Wimberley Texans compete in the following sports -

- Baseball
- Basketball
- Cross Country
- Football
- Golf
- Soccer
- Softball
- Swimming
- Tennis
- Track and Field
- Volleyball

=== State Titles ===
- Football -
  - 2005 (3A/D1), 2011 (3A/D2)
- Girls Soccer
  - 2026 (4A/D2)
- One Act Play
  - 1993 (2A), 2001 (3A)
- Team Tennis
  - 2021 (4A), 2023 (4A)
- Volleyball -
  - 1999 (3A), 2001 (3A), 2002 (3A), 2003 (3A), 2006 (3A), 2007 (3A), 2024 (4A/D2)

=== State Finalists ===
- Baseball
  - 2025 (4A/D2)
- Football
  - 2019 (4A/D2), 2022 (4A/D2)
- Volleyball
  - 2020 (4A), 2025 (4A/D2), 2026 (4A/D2)
