= Katherine Anne Porter School =

Charter school in Wimberley, Texas, United States

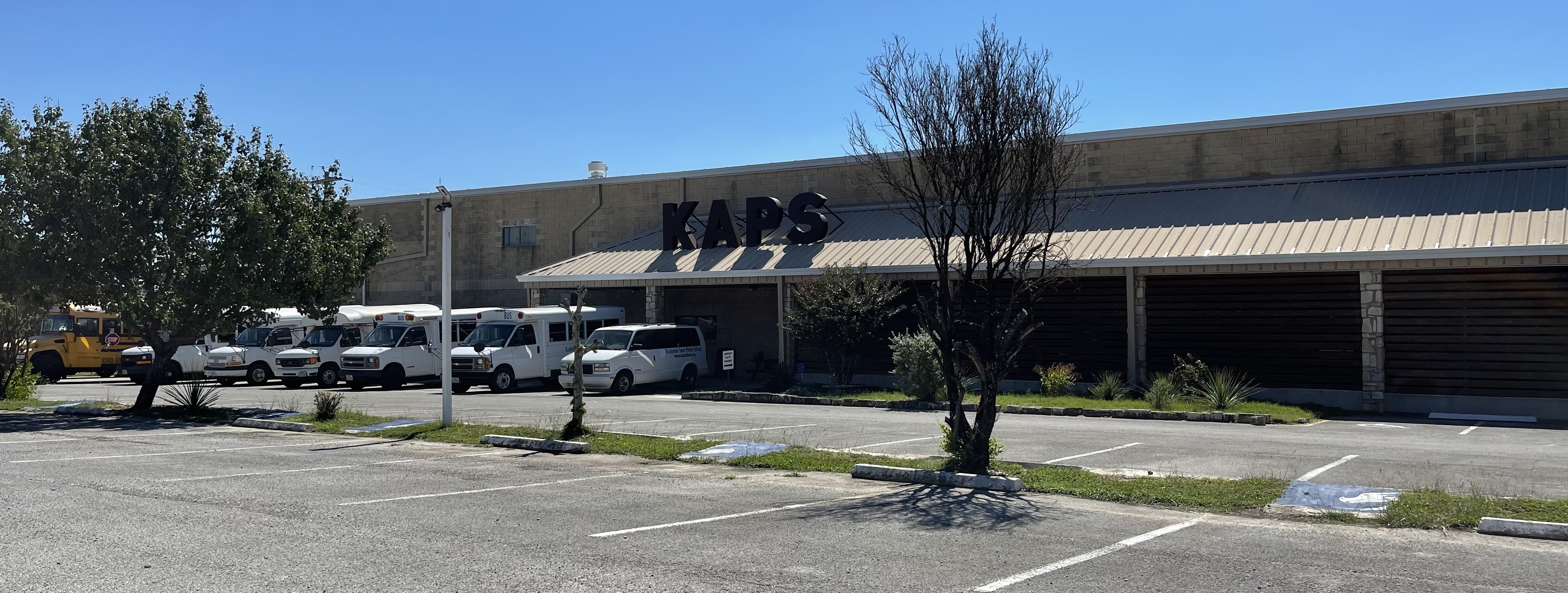

Location
- Wimberley, Texas; United States; 30.003°N 98.107°W

Information
- Other names: KAPS; KAP School
- Type: Public charter high school
- Motto: Great Art, Great Thought
- Religious affiliation: None
- Established: 1998
- Founder: Yana Bland
- School board: Katherine Anne Porter School Board of Trustees
- Superintendent: Mariah Ingram
- Staff: 8
- Faculty: 6
- Grades: 8 through 12
- Gender: All
- Enrollment: 62 (2026-2027)
- Language: English
- Colors: Black, silver, and blue
- Tuition: Tuition-free
- Communities served: Wimberley and surrounding areas
- Website: www.kapschool.org

The Katherine Anne Porter School, commonly referred to as KAPS, is a public charter high school in Wimberley, Texas, United States. It was founded in 1998 by Maltese politician and educator Yana Bland and named after Pulitzer Prize-winning American writer Katherine Anne Porter. The Austin American-Statesman described it as a "small, eclectic high school."

In the 2018–2019 school year, KAPS had 167 students across grades nine through twelve, and its faculty currently consists of only 25 members. The school has been said to "foster a love for learning, creative thinking, and community involvement" and features numerous afterschool activities and clubs.

The school claims to be nondiscriminatory on the basis of "race, color, sex, age, national origin, religion, sexual orientation, marital status, genetic identification, political affiliation, or disability in matters affecting employment," and students there have been said to be "very aware of environmental issues."

== History ==
KAPS was founded in 1998 by Yana Bland with the stated goal to "nurture students' interests, foster an appreciation for learning, enhance community responsibility, and to advance peace and human rights." The school states that its founders began as a group "dedicated to preserving [Katherine Porter's] memory" who purchased her childhood home in Kyle, Texas and "saw a need for a school focused on the arts in the rural hill country area."

=== Mural controversy ===
In 2000, an art student purportedly painted an image featuring two men kissing as part of a larger mural in a common area at KAPS. This sparked a controversy in which two Board of Trustees members demanded that the image be removed. Later, a meeting of the school faculty was held in which all 23 members at the time claimed to be in favor of preserving both the homoromantic image and the mural as a whole. Despite this unanimous agreement from the staff, just two weeks later the mural had been entirely painted over in white.

The mural is purported to have been "conceptualized" by Grady Roper, a former art teacher at KAPS, and to have also contained "Satanic" imagery and depictions of violence, on the subject of which Yana Bland claimed, "Most of the staff felt that ... the mural ... was inappropriate," and that "the [B]oard [of Trustees] was unanimous in feeling it was inappropriate for the school." She claimed that Roper would not cooperate with the Board when it requested he remove certain parts of the mural. According to The Austin Chronicle columnist Erica C. Barnett, Roper claimed that Bland had sanctioned the mural up until certain Board members voiced their disapproval of a few images depicted; and that two of the images in question were the one of two men kissing and another featuring a monster, claimed to be Satan by the Board. Roper claimed the Board would not have complained if the former depicted a straight couple. The wall where the mural had been was later painted over with the First Amendment.

Ultimately, Roper was terminated from his position at KAPS, which he claimed was due to his resistance to the Board; Bland, Barnett writes, replied that the termination was because Roper did not consult the Board before sanctioning the mural. In the opinion of Elizabeth Lee, who replaced Roper following his termination, both Roper and Bland acted in the right, and that the removal of the mural and "really [bad]" handling of the situation by the Board were products of the school's placement in a conservative town.

=== 2010 Texas Rain Catcher Award ===
In 2010, KAPS won the Texas Rain Catcher Award. According to the Texas Water Development Board:

Students at the school are very aware of environmental issues. With the help of grants from the Lower Colorado River Authority and other entities, and in partnership with local organizations such as Keep Wimberley Beautiful, Wimberley Lions Club, and the Pedernales Electric Co-op, the students installed several rainwater harvesting systems to collect and use rainwater at the school.

The harvested water is being used to irrigate an organic vegetable and flower garden, and a butterfly garden; all cared for and maintained by the students. It is also used to flush toilets inside the school, wash the school’s fleet of vehicles, and as a backup water supply for the Wimberley Volunteer Fire Station located next door.

As a direct result of the student’s initiative to harvest and use rainwater, the school’s water bill has been cut in half; from about $190 per month to about $90 per month.

KAPS harvested 32,000 gallons of water in 2010.

=== 2012 study ===
In 2012, a study by Children at Risk found KAPS to be the most improved high school in the Austin area and the third most improved in Texas, reporting improvement in math, science, AP exams, and college entrance exam rates. Yana Bland reportedly attributed this primarily to the school's low student–staff ratio.

=== COVID-19 pandemic ===
On March 16, 2020, soon after state emergency was declared in Texas due to the 2020 COVID-19 pandemic, school was set to be closed until April 5. Prior to the pandemic, learning was primarily done in person, but on March 24, all classes switched to online distance education. On April 6, in-person school was closed temporarily.

== School structure and curriculum ==
=== Structure ===
Classes at KAPS are typically very small due to the small number of students, with a reported 167 students total in the 2018–19 school year and a planned 35 students per grade level for the 2020–21 school year. With only 25 faculty members, 15 of whom are teachers, this will create just over a 9:1 student-to-teacher ratio.

On a typical school day, aside from classes and lunch, KAPS students also have a brunch early in the day. On a typical Monday, students also attend a school assembly and a mentor group.

=== Curriculum ===
KAPS is under the jurisdiction of the Texas Education Agency (TEA). Its core curriculum consists of TEA-required classes in social studies, science, mathematics, English language arts, PE, Spanish for Languages Other Than English (LOTE), and fine and technical arts. Various electives are taught at KAPS as well, including Tolkien studies.

== Extracurricular activities ==
KAPS students participate in various extracurricular groups, traditions, and sports.

Extracurricular groups at KAPS include LEO Club, the National Honor Society (NHS), Game Club, Songwriter's Club, and others.

Extracurricular events and holidays at KAPS include traditional events such as prom, homecoming dance, the Halloween dance, the MLK Day of Service, Career Day, food bank volunteering, and others; as well as more unique events such as Arts Fest, Pirates vs. Ninjas Day, the Chili Cook-Off, Cupcake Wars, Market Days, and others.

Sports at KAPS include volleyball, basketball, archery, yoga, and fishing.

== Notable alumni ==
In 2020, KAPS alumni Buck and Dylan Meek were nominated at the 62nd Annual Grammy Awards. U.F.O.F., an album by the band Big Thief, of which Buck is a part, was nominated for "Best Alternative Album." Spider-Man: Into the Spider-Verse, which included the song "Invincible," co-written by Dylan and performed by Aminé, was nominated for "Best Compilation Soundtrack for Visual Media."
