= Wimberley Independent School District =

School district in Texas, United States

Address
- 951 FM 2325 Wimberley, Texas, 78676; United States

District information
- Grades: PK–12
- Schools: 4
- NCES District ID: 4800009

Students and staff
- Students: 2,700 (2023–2024)
- Teachers: 182.27 (on an FTE basis)
- Student–teacher ratio: 14.81:1

Other information
- Website: www.wimberleyisd.net

Wimberley Independent School District is a public school district based in Wimberley, Texas, United States. In addition to most of Wimberley, the district serves the city of Woodcreek. In addition to Hays County, it extends into Comal County.

The district was formed on July 1, 1986, from portions of the Hays Consolidated and Dripping Springs districts.

In 2011, the school district was rated "Recognized" by the Texas Education Agency.

== Schools ==
- Wimberley High School (Grades 9–12)
- Danforth Junior High School (Grades 6–8)
- Jacob's Well Elementary School (Grades 3–5)
- Blue Hole Primary School (Grades PK-2)
