= ANSI A300 =

Tree care industry standard of care

ANSI A300 is the tree care industry standard of care in the USA. It was developed by Tree Care Industry Association and maintained by consensus of various industry stakeholders through periodically reviewing and updating the guidelines. The standard is divided into ten parts:

- Part 1 – Pruning
- Part 2 – Soil Management
- Part 3 – Supplemental Support Systems
- Part 4 – Lightning Protection Systems
- Part 5 – Management of Trees on Construction Sites
- Part 6 – Planting and Transplanting
- Part 7 – Integrated Vegetation Management
- Part 8 – Root Management Standard
- Part 9 – Tree Risk Assessment
- Part 10 – Integrated Pest Management

A proposed A300 Part 11, Urban Forest Products, was not adopted because it was deemed to be outside the scope of tree care management standards.
