= Wimberley, Texas =

- City
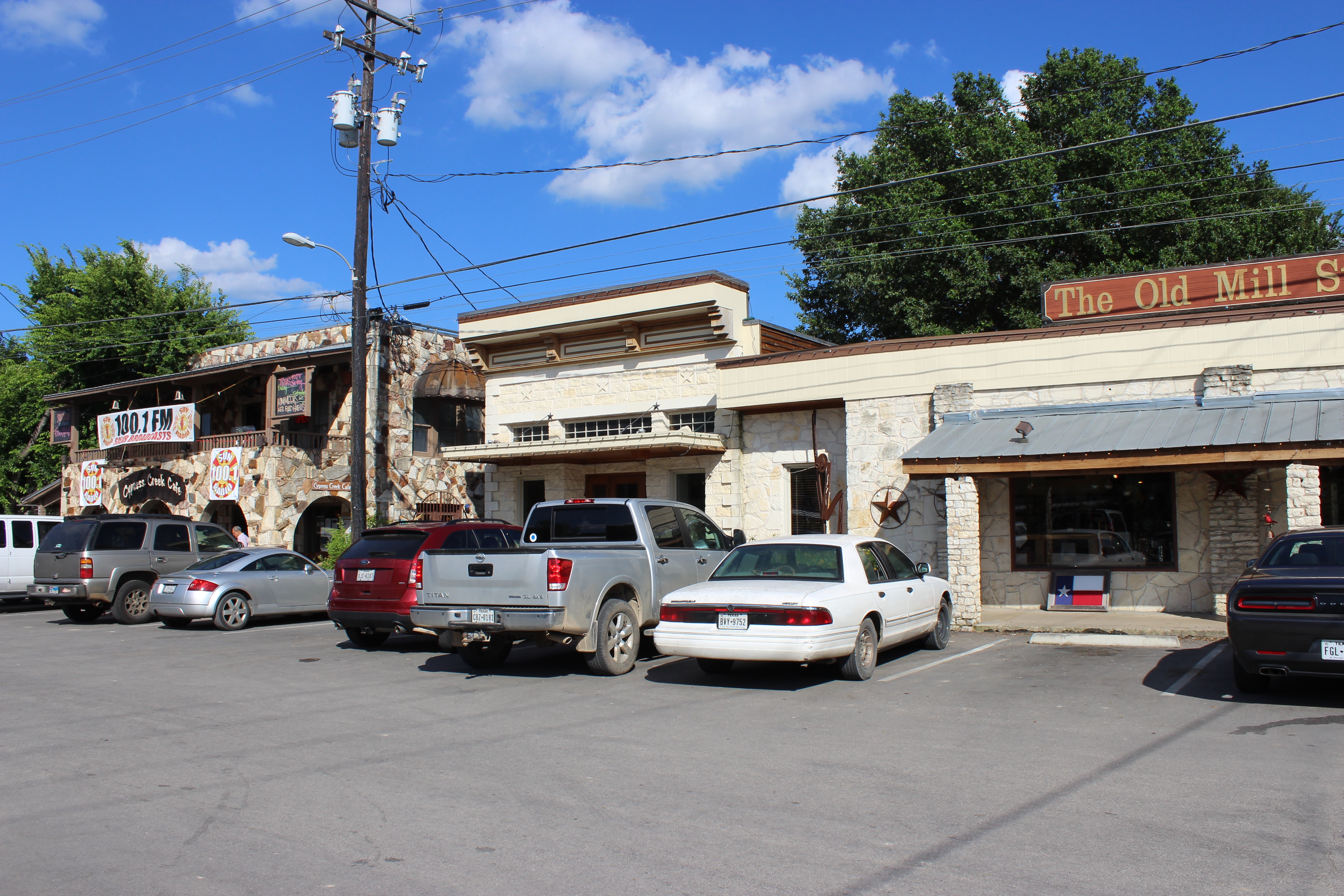
- Downtown Wimberley

- Location of Wimberley, Texas
- Coordinates: 29°58′50″N 98°06′23″W
- Country: United States
- State: Texas
- County: Hays
- Settled: 1856 (as Winters' Mill)
- Named: 1880
- Incorporated: May, 2000
- Founder: William Carvin Winters
- Named for: Pleasant Wimberley

Government
  - Type: Mayor-council government
  - Mayor: Jim Chiles

Area
  - Total: 8.95 sq mi (23.19 km^{2})
  - Land: 8.95 sq mi (23.19 km^{2})
  - Water: 0 sq mi (0.00 km^{2})
- Elevation: 850 ft (260 m)

Population (2020)
  - Total: 2,839
  - Density: 360.9/sq mi (139.35/km^{2})
- Time zone: UTC-6 (Central (CST))
  - Summer (DST): UTC-5 (CDT)
- ZIP code: 78676
- Area code(s): 512 & 737
- FIPS code: 48-79624
- GNIS feature ID: 2412278
- Website: www.cityofwimberley.com

Wimberley is a city in Hays County, Texas, United States. Wimberley was named after Pleasant Wimberley, who owned and operated the gristmill and cotton gin in the 1870s. The area around town is predominantly a ranching area. The population was 2,839 at the 2020 census.

== History ==
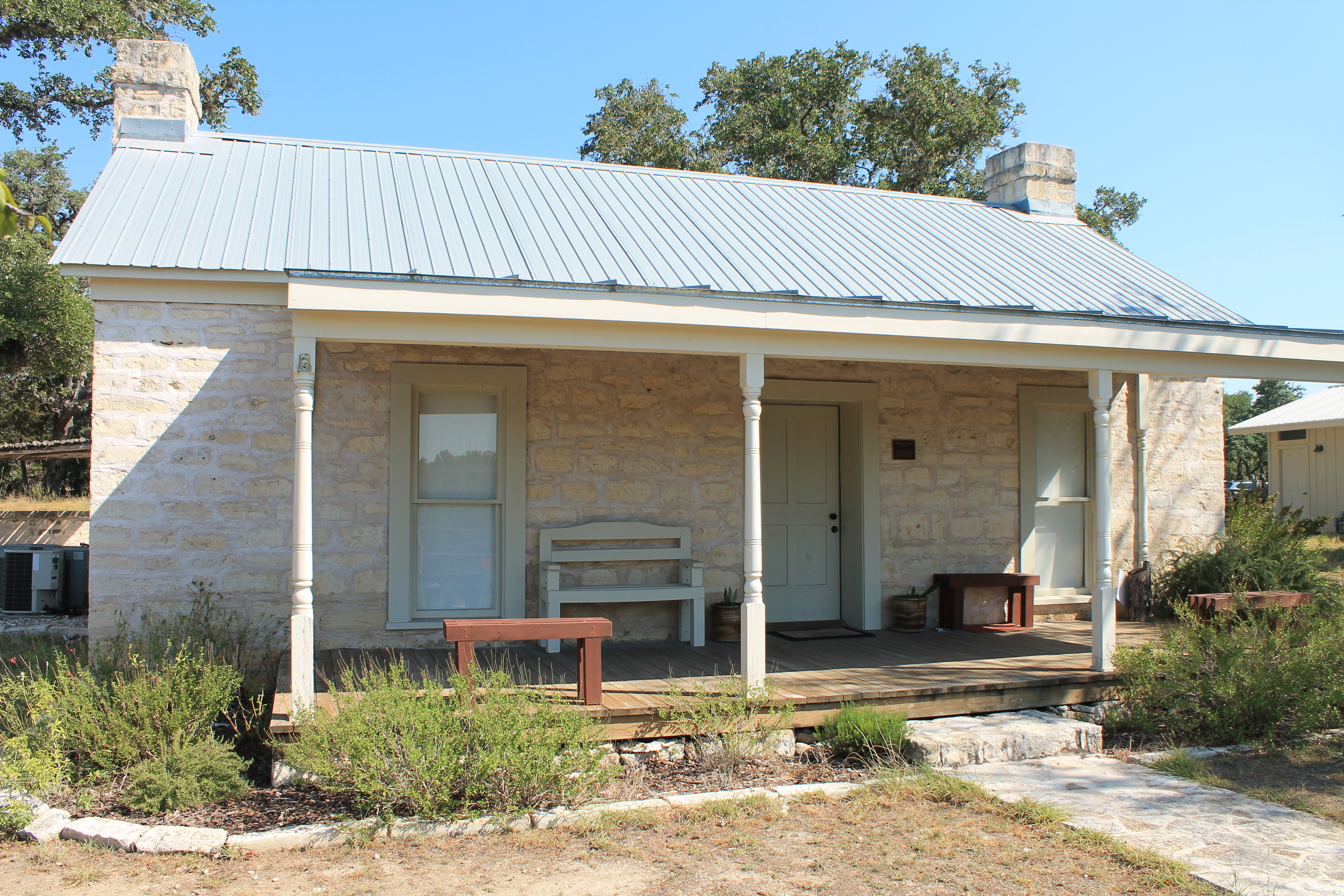
Winters-Wimberley House, c. 1856

Wimberley started as a trading post settlement near Cypress Creek in 1848, the year Hays County was organized. After William Carvin Winters built a gristmill at the site in 1856, it took on the name "Winters' Mill". When the mill was sold in 1864 to the Cude family, its name was changed to "Cude's Mill". It was sold again in 1874 to Pleasant Wimberley and took on his name. Over the years, the mill was expanded to process lumber, shingles, flour, molasses, and cotton.

The mill is gone, but Winter's home survives and is listed on the National Register of Historic Places.

In 1880, Alfred vom Stein, a postmaster from San Marcos, applied to have a post office established in the community, calling it "Wimberleyville". The application was granted, but the name was shortened to Wimberley. Although the mill was shut down in 1925, the community was established and grew, becoming known as a resort town and popular with tourists. Prior to its incorporation in May 2000, it was a census-designated place (CDP).

On May 25, 2015, the town was hit by flooding during the 2015 Texas–Oklahoma floods, along the Blanco River, which flows through the town. The river crested at an estimated 41.5 feet (12.6 m), which was almost 30 feet (9.1 m) above flood stage.

A Cessna 421 Golden Eagle crashed in Wimberley on April 30, 2026. The plane was carrying five members of the Amarillo pickleball club, who were all killed.

== Tourism ==
Wimberley features a large variety of locally owned businesses, including wineries, breweries, distilleries, boutiques, art galleries, antique shops, and restaurants. Wimberley Square has many of these businesses, with many buildings in and surrounding the square having historical limestone facades. The city actively prioritizes preservation of the town's rustic character. Cypress Creek runs adjacent to the square, with multiple restaurants along it that offer outdoor seating with a view of the waterway.

Located near the square is the Wimberley Valley Museum, which houses exhibits on local history, including its Native American and pioneer heritage.

The landscape in and around Wimberley features many parks and natural areas. Notable examples include Cypress Creek, the Blanco River, Jacob's Well, and Blue Hole Regional Park. While general admission to Blue Hole Regional Park—which includes hiking trails, a soccer field, and a play area—is free, a paid reservation for swimming is required during the summer. Additional trails are available at sites such as Mount Old Baldy, located in Old Baldy Park, where a 208-step staircase goes up to a 360° view of the Wimberley Valley. The trail has regulations to conserve the area, such as the prohibition of open fires, littering, drones, loud music, alcohol, glass, Styrofoam, and tree climbing. Many of the parks and natural areas near Wimberley have similar regulations, such as Jacob's Well Natural Area.

Wimberley is also home to the Wimberley Zipline, a course consisting of 10 ziplines spanning approximately 1 mile (1.6 km) in total, with the longest line measuring 900 feet (270 m). Riders can reach speeds of up to 30 miles per hour (48 km/h) and can view the surrounding Wimberley Valley up to 15 miles (24 km) away.

Wimberley has a dark-sky community designation, a program meant to reduce light pollution. Less light pollution gives greater visibility to the stars at night compared to surrounding areas, which has supported the growth of multiple luxury camping—referred to as glamping—businesses. The Yurtopian, a local destination for glamping located on Winn Ranch Road, features Mongolian yurts with accommodations like rooftop decks and hot tubs that encourage stargazing.

== Geography ==
Wimberley is located in western Hays County 38 miles (61 km) via road southwest of Austin and 58 miles (93 km) northeast of San Antonio.

According to the United States Census Bureau, the city has an area of 9.0 square miles (23.2 km^{2}), all land.

Cypress Creek joins the Blanco River in Wimberley; the Blanco then empties into the San Marcos River near the city of San Marcos, 16 miles (26 km) southeast of Wimberley. Blue Hole and Jacob's Well are located along Cypress Creek.

=== Climate ===
The climate in the Wimberley area is characterized by hot, humid summers and generally mild to cool winters. According to the Köppen climate classification, Wimberley has a humid subtropical climate, Cfa on climate maps.

== Demographics ==
Historical population
Census	Pop.	Note	%±
2010	2,626		—
2020	2,839		8.1%
U.S. Decennial Census; 1850–1901 1910 1920 1930 1940; 1950 1960 1970; 1980 1990 2000; 2010 2020

=== 2020 census ===
As of the 2020 census, Wimberley had a population of 2,839, 1,228 households, and 896 families. The median age was 56.4 years; 16.7% of residents were under 18 and 33.6% were 65 or older. For every 100 females, there were 91.2 males, and for every 100 females 18 and over, there were 89.7 males 18 and over.

None of residents lived in urban areas, while 100.0% lived in rural areas.

Of the 1,228 households in Wimberley, 22.0% had children under 18 living in them, 53.1% were married-couple households, 16.9% were households with a male householder and no spouse or partner present, and 26.2% were households with a female householder and no spouse or partner present. About 29.7% of all households were made up of individuals, and 16.3% had someone living alone who was 65 or older.

The city had 1,538 housing units, of which 20.2% were vacant. The homeowner vacancy rate was 2.2% and the rental vacancy rate was 8.5%.

Racial composition as of the 2020 census
Race	Number	Percentage
White	2,400	84.5%
Black or African American	12	0.4%
American Indian and Alaska Native	17	0.6%
Asian	13	0.5%
Native Hawaiian and other Pacific Islander	2	0.1%
Some other race	81	2.9%
Two or more races	314	11.1%
Hispanic or Latino (of any race)	387	13.6%

=== 2010 census ===
As of the 2010 census, 2,626 people, 1,145 households, and 726 families resided in the city. Of the 1,482 housing units, 337 were vacant; 245 of the vacant units were for seasonal or recreational use. The racial makeup of the city was 93.5% White, 0.5% African American, 1.5% Native American, 0.3% Asian, 2.8% from some other race, and 1.5% from two or more races. About 11.2% of the population were Hispanics or Latinos of any race.

Of the 1,145 households, 21.6% had children under 18 living with them, 53.4% were married couples living together, 7.3% had a female householder with no husband present, and 36.6% were not families; 30.3% of all households were made up of individuals, and 15.4% were someone living alone who was 65 or older. The average household size was 2.21, and the average family size was 2.72.

In the city, the age distribution was 16.8% under 18, 4.8%e from 18 to 24, 16.0% from 25 to 44, 35.4% from 45 to 64, and 26.9% were 65 or older. The median age was 52.7 years. For every 100 females, there were 90.8 males. For every 100 females 18 and over, there were 88.4 males.

=== 2012–2016 American Community Survey ===
For the period 2012–2016, the estimated median annual income for a household was $68,359 and for a family was $88,958. Male full-time workers had a median income of $61,429 versus $38,611 for females. The per capita income for the city was $44,219. About 8.8% of the population and 7.5% of families were below the poverty line; 17.3% of those under 18 and 3.8% of those 65 or older were living in poverty.

== Education ==
Wimberley Public Schools are part of the Wimberley Independent School District. The district has one primary school, one elementary school, one junior high school, and two high schools (Wimberley High School and Katherine Anne Porter School, a public charter high school). Students attend Wimberley High School or Katherine Anne Porter School, Scudder Primary School, Jacob's Well Elementary School, or Danforth Junior High School.

== Notable people ==
- Nathan Brown (born 1969), formerly poet laureate of Oklahoma, lives in Wimberley
- Bob Decker (1922–1967), Minnesota state senator and educator
- Ray Wylie Hubbard (born 1967), Texas music legend, moved to Wimberley in his early 40s
- Sarah Jarosz (born 1991), bluegrass singer-songwriter, was raised in Wimberley
- Leon Jaworski (1905–1982), special prosecutor in the Watergate Scandal, died in Wimberley
- Philip McKeon (1964–2019), former child actor, moved to Wimberley in the 2000s
- Buck Meek (born 1987), singer-songwriter and guitarist in Big Thief
- Rupert Neve (1926–2021), British creator of audio recording equipment
- Paul Simon and his Dallas-born wife, singer Edie Brickell, have a home in Wimberley
- Lathan Mckay (born 1979), Film, television, documentary producer, actor, historian, writer and co-founder of the Evel Knievel Museum has lived in Wimberley since 2015.
- Kevin Welch (born 1955), singer-songwriter, moved to Wimberley in his early 50s.
