= National Association of State Foresters =

Non-profit organization of forestry agencies

- Formation: 1920
- Headquarters: Washington, D.C.
- Website: http://www.stateforesters.org/

The National Association of State Foresters (NASF) is a non-profit organization that represents the directors of the 50 state forestry agencies, eight United States territories, and the District of Columbia. State foresters manage and protect state and private forests across the United States, which together encompass two-thirds of the nation's forests.

Through public-private partnerships, NASF seeks to discuss, develop, sponsor and promote programs and activities which will advance the practice of sustainable forestry, the conservation and protection of forest lands and associated resources and the establishment and protection of forests in the urban environment. NASF was established in 1920.

The Cooperative Forest Fire Prevention (CFFP) Program, commonly known as the Smokey Bear program, was created to maintain public awareness of the need to prevent human caused wildfires. It is managed by the United States Forest Service in cooperation with the Ad Council and NASF.
