= List of Pumpkin Scissors episodes =

Pumpkin Scissors is a 2006 Japanese anime television series based on a manga series by Ryoutarou Iwanaga of the same name. The series follows Second Lieutenant Alice L. Malvin, the leader of the Pumpkin Scissors, as she and her platoon go on missions to provide war relief to the public after the Royal Empire signed an armistice against the Republic of Frost. It was produced by Gonzo and AIC, directed by Katsuhito Akiyama. The opening theme is "Aoki Flamme" (蒼き炎(フランム)) by Yōko Takahashi, and the ending themes is "Mercury GO" (マーキュリー★GO) by Kana Ueda and Yukai na Nakama-tachi except for episode 18, where it is "Pumpkin Ondo" (パンプキン音頭) by Kana Ueda. It was broadcast in 24 episodes on Tokyo MX between October 2, 2006, and March 17, 2007. It is licensed by Funimation.

The show began airing in English on Animax Asia from May 21, 2010, to June 23, 2010.

== Episode list ==
No.	Title	Original release date	English release date
1	"The Invisible 9"; Transliteration: "Fukashi no 9ban" (Japanese: 不可視の9番)	October 2, 2006	May 21, 2010
Three years after the Royal Empire signed an armistice against the Republic of Frost called the Thin Ice Treaty, Randel Oland, a veteran corporal of the 901st Anti-Tank Troop, learns from a waitress at a restaurant that a tank outfit became bandits, using a dam as their fort. At the town square, Alice L. Malvin, second lieutenant of the Imperial Army and field leader of State Section III (aka the Pumpkin Scissors), confronts Wolmarf, leader of the 903rd Chemical Tactics Troop (aka Grauwolfe). However, Wolmarf retreats after shooting blank ammunition. At a pub in the evening, Alice believes that Randel has eyes that resemble that of her horse Pilo. When the villagers start feeling faint, Alice and Randel realize that Wolmarf previously shot a chemical weapon called Kirsche-3 instead of blank ammunition. Since there might be an antidote hidden inside the dam, Randel opens the floodgate and immobilizes the tank. Alice swiftly takes the antidote from Wolmarf's hand before Randel eventually kills Wolmarf with his Door Knocker, which resembles a Thompson/Center Contender pistol. The next morning, Alice and Randel are relieved when the villagers survive after taking the antidote.
2	"War Relief Unit"; Transliteration: "Sensai fukkou butai" (Japanese: 戦災復興部隊)	October 9, 2006	May 24, 2010
At the Imperial Army Intelligence Control Office, Randel arrives late for his first mission as an official member of the Pumpkin Scissors. Alice and Randel, along with warrant officers Martis and Oreldo, head to the territory of Wolkinson, where there has been an anonymous petition to arrest viscount Wolkins. The Pumpkin Scissors storm into the estate and confronts Wolkins for chaining commoners together and forcing them to participate in a grisly game, in which Wolkins employed Hoslow, a former tank engineer of the Imperial Army. As a result, Alice is held at gunpoint by the royal maids, while Randel, Oreldo and Martis are chained together and forced to participate in the grisly game. Realizing that the royal maids filed the anonymous complaint, Alice reveals that she comes from a noble family, inspiring the royal maids to aim their guns at the tank. Randel manages to kill Hoslow at point-blank range, leaving Wolkins helpless. Before the tank tips over, Alice saves Randel from being crushed, leading to Wolkins's arrest. In the aftermath, Alice receives a letter explaining that the royal maids returned to their hometowns.
3	"For That Is a Precious Thing"; Transliteration: "So wa toutokimono narite" (Japanese: 其は貴きものなりて)	October 16, 2006	May 25, 2010
Alice is berated by her noble father and two sisters Solice and Elis for her role in the Imperial Army. Upon arriving late for the next mission, Alice is briefed by captain Hunks that the SU-13 tunnel in the south has collapsed during the war and needs to be rebuilt. The Pumpkin Scissors ride on a shield train near a local village, where they meet a young boy named Peter. However, Peter's father Handke is against the reconstruction of the tunnel because the Royal Empire cheated the villagers five years ago. Peter later becomes fascinated by the shield train, while Alice starts excavating the tunnel by herself until she passes out. By nightfall, Alice and Randel discuss the role of doctors and patients. The next morning, Alice shows her family crest on the hilt of her sword to the villagers. The tunnel caves in when Peter takes off with the shield train. Alice and Handke find a way inside, and Alice manages to shut off the shield train and calm down Peter. Gladly, Randel breaks through the rubble and saves them. Later on, the villagers start repairing the tunnel, while Alice encourages Randel, Oreldo and Martis to help.
4	"The Cracked Portrait"; Transliteration: "Hibiwareta shouzou" (Japanese: ヒビ割れた肖像)	October 23, 2006	May 26, 2010
Webner, first lieutenant of the Imperial Army, discovers that Wolkins's tank has an autoloader with developing technology, though Hunks mentioned that Wolkins was admitted to a mental ward. The Pumpkin Scissors are sent on a mission to see professor Kortu, who denies knowing anything about Wolkins's tank. Kortu then shows Martis an inoperable model of the Door Knocker and details its history. The Pumpkin Scissors go to a warehouse, where Webner is currently dismantling Wolkins's tank for forensic analysis. Suddenly, three armored car hijackers fire tear gas from a rhino tank, destroying Wolkin's tank. When Martis is left lying in front of the oncoming rhino tank, he is lifted up by Randel, who is consequently stabbed in the left leg with the rhino tank's hedgerow cutters. Sometime later, Martis tells Hunks that the three armored car hijackers are declared dead, while Randel will be recovering at the hospital for a month due to his injuries. Moreover, there are no records of the 901st Anti-Tank Troop in the Imperial Army since it is part of the Invisible 9. Lili Stecchin, sergeant major of the Imperial Army, reports that Wolkins has committed suicide at the mental ward.
5	"Shallow-Minded Men"; Transliteration: "Asahaka na otoko-tachi" (Japanese: あさはかな者達(おとこたち))	October 30, 2006	May 27, 2010
Alice scolds Randel when he temporarily left the hospital to feed his stray cats. Rosetta, the nurse on duty, requests Wantz, another injured patient who is a briefcase factory worker, to keep an eye on Randel. In the State Section Archives, Martis reluctantly allows Oreldo to help dig up dirt on Randel. Oreldo charms Mireille from the personnel department into showing him classified files. On their way to see Randel at the hospital, Oreldo and Martis cross paths with Alice. At night, Rosetta learns from Randel that Wantz has been missing since the afternoon, noting that Wantz left his attaché case behind. When Wantz is found attempting suicide by jumping off the roof, he reveals that the attaché case was his severance package. As Randel expresses that he found redemption by joining the Pumpkin Scissors, he convinces Wantz to continue living his life. However, a wind gust makes Wantz nearly trip over the ledge until Randel risks his life by pushing back Wantz to safety. Rosetta and Wantz pull up Oreldo and Martis, who grab a hold of Randel and prevent him from falling off the ledge. Meanwhile, Hunks meets Dr. Muzé Kauplan after a meeting regarding Wolkins's tank.
6	"A Fruitful Time"; Transliteration: "Houjou na jikan" (Japanese: 豊饒(ほうじょう)な時間)	November 6, 2006	May 28, 2010
Randel finds Dieter, an abandoned baby left in a basket, and brings it to the Imperial Army Intelligence Control Office. Unfortunately, Alice and Lili are unable to stop Dieter from crying incessantly. After Oreldo changes Dieter's diaper, Dieter finally stops crying when Randel cradles him. Since Dieter might be sent to an orphanage if unclaimed, Hunks allows Alice, Oreldo and Martis to go on a mission to find Dieter's mother, but they are unsuccessful when questioning vendors at a black market. Oreldo ends up leaving an impression on a grumpy old man, who insults Alice for trying to save and feed the war orphans. With Alice, Oreldo and Martis having no luck in finding Dieter's mother, Alice finds Randel with Dieter outside the Imperial Army Intelligence Control Office. Soon after, Alice spots Dieter's mother beyond the gates. It is revealed that the husband of Dieter's mother was arrested for moving contraband during a train inspection. Dieter's mother leaves after apologizing to Hunks for her actions, though Lili is upset that she did not get to hold Dieter one last time.
7	"The One Who Leads And The One Who Follows"; Transliteration: "Odoru mono odorasareru mono" (Japanese: 踊る者踊らされる者)	November 13, 2006	May 31, 2010
Thanks to an anonymous tip, Hunks sends Randel, Oreldo, Martis and private first class messenger dog Mercury to find missing supplies that never reached the province of Nigel. Meanwhile, Alice takes the day off to meet her fiancé, though she shows no enthusiasm. Solice and Elis advise Alice to dress more feminine before duke Schultz escorts Alice in a stagecoach to an engagement party. Randel, Oreldo, Martis and Mercury head to the castle, where the supplies are being squandered. At a nearby tower, lord Ian has his retainers Automatic rifles. Martis has Mercury send a message of distress to Hunks. Mercury soon runs into Alice, who commandeers the stagecoach. When Alice arrives at the castle, Randel shoots at the tower, allowing Oreldo and Martis to corner Ian inside. It is revealed that Ian received automatic rifles from an unknown benefactor, and he sequestered himself in the castle over the fear of being murdered by commoners. With Ian detained and the supplies confiscated, Martis believes that the automatic rifles and Wolkins's tank are related. Alice is surprised when her actual fiancé Lionel Taylor arrives shortly after. While escorting Alice to the engagement party, Lionel reveals that he sent the anonymous tip.
8	"Burn in the Snowfields"; Transliteration: "Setsugen ni moete" (Japanese: 雪原に燃えて)	November 20, 2006	June 1, 2010
Alice, Randel, Oreldo and Martis must deliver a briefcase to the snowy northern region of Essan within two days, though Hunks warns them about bandits operating along the mountain passes. After being ambushed by bandits and crashing their snowcat off a cliff, the Pumpkin Scissors make it out of the wreckage and continue their mission. After the sidekick Mueller finds canned food from raiding the snowcat, the leader Walter realizes that the Pumpkin Scissors took something more valuable with them. Taking refuge in a cabin at night, the Pumpkin Scissors calculate that it will take four hours to hike towards Essan. Since a blizzard will not let up until morning, their limited supplies and rations are split among them. The Pumpkin Scissors are forced to use the fireplace, which exposes their location to the bandits. When the bandits surround the cabin, the Pumpkin Scissors create a makeshift sled from a blanket to kill Mueller and escape from the cabin. Oreldo and Martis take Alice across a wooden bridge, while Randel reveals to Walter that the briefcase contains a serum before inducing an avalanche that wipes out Walter and the bandits. The Pumpkin Scissors then arrive at Essan in time.
9	"The Woman in the Morning Mist"; Transliteration: "Asagiri no onna" (Japanese: 朝霧の女)	November 27, 2006	June 2, 2010
Oreldo encounters a depressed woman named Hannah on the Mainz Bridge. At an elegant brothel called Windmühle, the proprietress tells Oreldo that Hannah started working there since her seventeenth birthday after her parents died and has been waiting for her boyfriend named Frank to return home from the war since four years ago. After Oreldo says Hannah has an empty soul, Randel later brings this up to Martis and Lili, who later report to Hunks that Oreldo is in love, having witnessed Oreldo and Hannah coming from Windmühle. On a rooftop overlooking the capital, Oreldo suggests Hannah to find closure, but Hannah insists that Frank will return home. One night, Oreldo is kicked out by three bouncers after he attacks a customer wearing a top hat. The proprietress tells Oreldo that Hannah received a letter saying that Frank was killed in action, but Hannah would not accept this news. Oreldo finds Hannah at the Mainz Bridge, where he informs her that Frank died during the Battle of Neugelitz, based on his research in the State Section Archives. Later on, Hannah is shown to be in good spirits, while Oreldo laughs when Martis and Lili assumed that he was heartbroken.
10	"Pumpkins and Scissors"; Transliteration: "Kabocha to hasami" (Japanese: カボチャとハサミ)	December 4, 2006	June 5, 2010
While repairing Randel's uniform, Lili reveals how State Section III has changed over time. One year ago, Martis was assigned to the Elite Corps Division of State Section I, only to be at odds with major Ranke and his adjutant Rudolf about war relief supplies. Martis initially declined an offer from Oreldo to join State Section III. After Ranke threatened to transfer Martis to the reserve, Martis decided to join State Section III when Hunks hinted about a corruption case against Ranke. At a scullery, Oreldo chased away Rudolph, who chided Martis for doing degrading volunteer work. Alice felt unwelcomed by Oreldo and Martis when she first joined State Section III and became the field leader. When Alice, Oreldo and Martis later issued Ranke with an arrest warrant, Ranke ordered Rudolph to shoot Alice, but Oreldo mentioned Alice being the daughter of a noble. Martis shielded Alice from being shot by Rudolph, though Martis only had a superficial gunshot wound, while Ranke and Rudolph were court-martialed. In the present, Lili explains to Randel that Alice designed the insignia of the Pumpkin Scissors. It represents cutting down the barriers of thick-skinned aggravators who hide from justice with money, violence and bureaucracy.
11	"The Quiet Quickening"; Transliteration: "Shizuka naru Taidou" (Japanese: 静かなる胎動)	December 11, 2006	June 4, 2010
A reporter named Dalton takes a photo of the Pumpkin Scissors and writes a positive article in his newspaper called Die Welt. Later paying a visit to Kortu, Dalton mentions that Randel has an operable model of the Door Knocker despite this experiment being canceled by the Imperial Army. As the newspaper article gets published the following day, Alice declines Schultz's offer to take a ride in his stagecoach. However, Alice momentarily gets kidnapped by a woman named Cecil. Schultz realizes this when he does not find Alice in the Imperial Army Intelligence Control Office. In a slum, Cecil and her accomplices Bruno and Rick reveal that Cecil's late brother was an underground journalist who wrote a manuscript about a scandal that was covered up by the Imperial Army. Cecil believes that publishing this manuscript will have the power to change the government. After learning that Kortu heard from Dalton about Randel's Door Knocker, Kauplan says that it is an evolving experiment. Kauplan then kills Kortu and bombs his apartment. While Alice urges Cecil to make the change instead of talking about it, Bruno and Rick show candid photos of Solice and Elis, hinting that they could be in danger.
12	"Unseen Pain"; Transliteration: "Miezaru itami" (Japanese: 見えざる痛み)	December 18, 2006	June 7, 2010
Dalton informs Hunks and Martis that Kortu has died. Hunks deduces that Kauplan created the Invisible 9. Dalton leaves after Alice walks in unharmed. Alice reveals that the manuscript exposes the truth about the Invisible 9. After tricking Randel and Oreldo into believing that Alice was still kidnapped, Dalton offers to buy the manuscript from Cecil, Bruno and Rick. Bruno knocks out a hesitant Cecil and proceeds to seal the deal. Alice and Randel chance upon Cecil at a bar, while Bruno and Rick are shot by an assassin in an alleyway. After learning that Cecil was betrayed by Bruno and Rick, Alice says that she sympathizes with people living in poor circumstances. When Dalton arrives at the bar, Alice demands Dalton to return the manuscript since it will cause more harm than good. When Dalton suddenly gets shot in the back by the assassin, Randel eventually defeats the assassin, who takes a suicide pill before Alice can get answers. Unfortunately, the editor-in-chief of Die Welt says that the manuscript has disappeared. After learning that Bruno and Rick were also killed, Cecil departs after knowing that war relief is impossible, leaving Alice frustrated for being unable to protect.
13	"Crude But Elegant"; Transliteration: "Soya ni shite bimi" (Japanese: 粗野にして美味)	December 25, 2006	June 8, 2010
Princess Septième Rodelia, seventh in line for the throne of the neighboring kingdom of Rodelia, travels by train to the Royal Empire after learning that State Section III arrested a smuggler from Rodelia. Using the restroom after being ditched by Oreldo at the park, Martis soon encounters Septième, who ditched her majordomo. Martis and Septième are both fond of a hot dog cart which recently closed up shop. They later find out that the hot dog cart owner had his business license revoked for tax evasion. Septième explains that the national flag of Rodelia has grapes, which represent the royal children vying for the throne. Martis and Septième arrive at a slum, finding the hot dog cart owner, but Martis yells at Septième for trying to exploit the hot dog cart owner. An upset Septième runs away to an alley in District Zero, where she is harassed by two hoodlums. Martis finds Septième and eventually defeats the hoodlums. After allowing Alice to keep the smuggler detained for interrogation, Septième requests Martis to be her official escort. Traveling back to Rodelia by train, Septième tells her majordomo that she rather take advantage of compassion rather than weakness.
14	"The Flame Still Burns"; Transliteration: "Honoo, imada kiezu" (Japanese: 焔、いまだ消えず)	January 6, 2007	June 9, 2010
The Pumpkin Scissors investigate refugees taking shelter at an aqueduct, in which an aquifer system that runs under the entire city was laid down by the Mion Waterworks Company. Alice announces that the Pumpkin Scissors will lead the refugees to a state-run farm in order for them to make a living, though some refugees choose to stay behind. Metz, a henchman working for the Mion Waterworks Company, is arrested for carrying drugs called Himmel. Although Hunks says that the focus should be on the illegal drug trade, Major Connery mentions that the Mion Waterworks Company has been an important financial sponsor for the Imperial Army. Albert Mion, the president of the Mion Waterworks Company, posts bail for Metz. This happens repeatedly after the Pumpkin Scissors bust Metz for selling Himmel in the aqueduct. Albert then gives Metz and the other henchmen a shipment of new automatic rifles, which they later use to ambush the Pumpkin Scissors in the aqueduct. When the Pumpkin Scissors manage to escape, they come across Hans, a retired soldier of the 908th High-Temperature Troop now working for Albert. Hans wears a protective suit and wields a flamethrower.
15	"Decisions Run Astray"; Transliteration: "Meisou suru sentaku" (Japanese: 迷走する選択)	January 13, 2007	June 10, 2010
Hans blocks the Pumpkin Scissors from reaching the exit. Randel prepares to shoot Hans until the latter calls the former his comrade in arms until the spillways sweep away Randel and Hans. Waking up in the hospital, Randel is relieved that Alice and the others are okay. Sometime later, Kauplan pays a visit to Randel, revealing that she developed an analgesic in fluid form for the 908th High-Temperature Troop that numbs the pain of being burned, though she lied about the protective suits being useful. Alice continues to arrest Metz for selling drugs in the aqueduct again, but he is always released shortly after. When Oreldo and Martis come across one of the refugees named Marielle, she breaks down in tears when Oreldo compliments her haircut. In a bidding move, Oreldo and Martis motivate the other refugees, including Marielle's father, to stop taking Himmel and leave the aqueduct to make a living. Metz later testifies that Albert will receive the next shipment of Himmel tonight, also noting that Albert used him for the illegal drug trade despite keeping him off the streets. While Alice, Randel and Martis set out to bust Albert, Hunks gives Oreldo a special assignment.
16	"The One Who Slashes"; Transliteration: "Kirisakishi mono" (Japanese: 斬り裂きし者)	January 20, 2007	June 11, 2010
At the mansion, Hans and Albert are visited by the Emissary, who wears a silver mask and serves a secret organization called the Society of the Silver Wheel. The Emissary gives Albert the next shipment of Himmel and tells Hans to look after Albert, who feels virtually ignored. Albert gathers his henchmen to aim at the Emissary, but Hans refuses to obey Albert since the Emissary ordered Hans to protect Albert. The Emissary wipes out most of Albert's henchmen when he pulls out two small blades attached to strings, causing Albert to beg for forgiveness. Claymore I, the elite reconnaissance unit of State Section I, mobilizes at the mansion in search of missing documents. Alice, Randel and Martis soon arrive at the mansion, where Randel searches for Hans. Alice fends off Claymore I as she unsheathes her double-bladed longsword called Mähne. Finding Randel in the aqueduct, Martis estimates that Alice only has an hour to fend off Claymore I. Oreldo informs Hunks that Connery is submitted a request for Claymore I to open fire on Alice. Elsewhere, Kauplan has a suitcase with samples of blood, skin, hair and nails that she took from Randel during his previous hospital stay.
17	"The Darkness That Cannot Be Saved"; Transliteration: "Nao sukuwarenu yami tachi" (Japanese: なお救われぬ闇たち)	January 27, 2007	June 14, 2010
Three years ago after the war ended, Hans kept on his protective suit after seeing the rest of his unit bleed to death. In the present, Hunks offers to discuss about an organization handing out automatic rifles only if Connery withdraws his request for Claymore I to open fire on Alice. After being defeated by Alice, the executive officer of Claymore I hints that another squad from Claymore I has reached the aqueduct. When Randel and Martis follow close behind Hans and Albert, Randel overhears Hans saying that he will die if he removes his protective suit. Randel urges Hans to surrender so he can seek help from Kauplan. Martis throws a concussion grenade towards Hans, but Hans uses his flamethrower to detonate it from a distance. Hans tries to attack Randel when he inches closer, but Randel chucks another concussion grenade in order to whisk away the flames from his clothes. Randel uses a pair of loppers to pry open Han's protective suit. Snubnose, captain of the Claymore I, then opens fire on Hans, while Albert is caught in the crossfire. Hans's body is wheeled off by Claymore I, while Alice witnesses Randel crying uncontrollably over what happened.
18	"A Small Military Power"; Transliteration: "Chiisa na senryoku" (Japanese: 小さな戦力)	February 3, 2007	June 15, 2010
Lili wants to raise Randel's morale following the incident with the Mion Waterworks Company. Her plans to perform a "lunatic two-step" in front of Mercury in the storeroom, ask Oreldo for advice on relaxation in the office and admire Martis for pulling his own weight in the mess hall all end in extreme embarrassment. Oreldo confronts Randel over how many people need saving for a mission to become successful. Rahn, a warrant officer of the Double Shotel Platoon of State Section I, later approaches and belittles Randel, Oreldo, Martis and Lili, provoking Lili and Oreldo to fight back. Webner tells Martis that she told Connery about the incident regarding the three armored car hijackers inside the rhino tank. Meanwhile, Snubnose and the executive officer inform Connery that the automatic rifles are being mass-produced by someone. Lili decides to cheer up Randel by singing a "soup song", but Randel recognizes that it originated in the Republic of Frost. She reveals that she was a musician prior to joining State Section III. Randel finds Oreldo outside, where the refugees, including Marielle, are being transported to the state-run farm. Apologizing to Randel, Oreldo realizes that the life of every person saved is valuable.
19	"A Sweet Trap"; Transliteration: "Amai Wana" (Japanese: 甘い罠)	February 10, 2007	June 16, 2010
Randel, Oreldo, Martis and Lili learn that Alice plans to get married in a few days. Volunteering at a countryside soup kitchen, Oreldo and Martis discuss that Randel may have feelings for Alice. At a mansion, Alice, Solice and Elis attend a ball. Schultz soon realizes that Alice's heart is set on State Section III. Lionel timely appears to court Alice before she was about to shake the greasy hand of marquis Paulo, the chief financial administrator of the Royal Empire, who just finished eating pizza. Alice privately tells Lionel that she wants to annul their engagement since her five-year-old younger brother is next in line to the throne within the next few years. Lionel is actually shocked because Alice does not exhibit any regret in breaking off their relationship. Suddenly, Paulo gets upset when the paste of the canapés was made from acorns. Schultz witnesses Alice finally smiling when she eats a canapé off the floor despite embarrassing Solice and Elis. Deep in the woods in the evening, Randel witnesses a commoner named Carl telling his comrades of the plan to use obtained documents to incriminate Paulo for embezzlement, but Randel is momentarily knocked unconscious by a shovel.
20	"Enter the Performers"; Transliteration: "Enja nyuujou" (Japanese: 演者入場)	February 17, 2007	June 17, 2010
Connery deploys the 4th Axe Force of State Section I to retrieve the documents. Deep in the woods, Randel is pelted onto the ground with a sledgehammer. Oreldo fortunately arrives to defeat the two commoners. Randel regains consciousness at the soup kitchen after having a recurring dream of being dragged down into a pool of blood by many hands. Obtaining copies of the documents, Oreldo warns the two commoners that State Section I will confiscate the documents, pressure the media into covering up the story and torture them for leaked information. Oreldo and Martis soon learn from Randel that Carl is staging an attack on Paulo. Marquis Nichelle Hoost, a soft-spoken and charismatic noble recommended for a political post, finally arrives at the mansion moments before Carl gatecrashes the ball, though Alice puts a stop to this. Carl then unveils the documents and expresses extreme disgust with Paulo. When Randel, Oreldo and Martis drive into the mansion, Randel takes a bullet to the shoulder that was aimed at Paulo. Since the Pumpkin Scissors cannot arrest Paulo despite acquiring the written evidence to incriminate Paulo for embezzlement, Alice settles the matter by challenging Paulo to a duel.
21	"The Puppet and the Idol"; Transliteration: "Deku to Guuzou" (Japanese: 木偶と偶像)	February 24, 2007	June 18, 2010
When Paulo believes that Alice is joking around, Alice reaches for her concealed family sword under her dress, prompting Solice and Elis to censor Alice with a tablecloth. Paulo hides behind his two bodyguards named Alan and Jan when Alice points her family sword at Paulo. When Randel stands in front of Alice, Jan preemptively attempts to strike Randel with a flail, though Randel timely dodges due to Alice's warning. Alice realizes that Alan and Jan are mercenary guardsmen from Rodelia. Randel jumps back out of a window and runs to the corner of the mansion. When Alan pulls out a machete covered in brown liquid, Alice wagers the integrity of the nobles for the duel, though this angers Carl. After using his flail to hit Randel squarely in the chest, Jan is not intimidated when Randel threatens with his Door Knocker. Lionel proposes that Paulo will be arrested for a confession and Carl will be acquitted of all wrongdoing if Alice wins the duel. Alan requests to take the military light utility vehicle from the Pumpkin Scissors as a "getaway car" if he wins, Alice accepts the condition and starts the duel.
22	"Lonely Scales"; Transliteration: "Kodoku na Tenbin" (Japanese: 孤独な天秤)	March 3, 2007	June 21, 2010
The 4th Axe Force establishes a perimeter, only permitting the Emissary to pass through. After explaining that the brown liquid from his machete is mud from a marsh in Rodelia, Alan steps on Alice's dress, forcing Alice to tear her dress and free herself. When Carl inches closer to Paulo, Alice springs into action to save Paulo from getting hurt. Alice later says that nobles must fight foreign and domestic enemies. When Carl aims his gun at Alice, Elis makes a plea that nobles have families and friends just as much as commoners, while Solice stops Oreldo and Martis from interfering. Alice tells Carl that she cannot tolerate inequality. After shooting his Door Knocker and causing spooked horses to burst out from a nearby stable, Randel grabs onto Jan's left leg, in which Jan's right arm is trampled by a carriage. Randel then throws Jan's body through the window before he walks towards Alice, telling her that he as a corporal wants to protect her as a second lieutenant. Regaining composure, thanks to the scent of Randel's jacket, Alice declares that the mansion is now the operational domain of the Pumpkin Scissors.
23	"And Then, An Alluring Trap"; Transliteration: "Soshite Amai Wana" (Japanese: そして甘い罠)	March 10, 2007	June 22, 2010
While Alice and Alan continue their intense duel, one of the commoners named Hatchet Josh gets riled up when Randel stands in the way. Oreldo tells Paulo that the money embezzled would be worth an extra grain of wheat for every hungry child. Hunks distracts a Red Beret of the 4th Axe Force at the perimeter, allowing Mercury to scale over a wall and head to the mansion undetected. Becoming exhausted during the duel, Alice switches holding her family sword from her right hand to her left hand, in which she is finally able to throw Alan's machete off its trajectory. Alice reveals that this left-handed defensive sword technique is called the main-gauche. She then goes on the offensive, eventually managing to knock the machete out of Alan's right hand before slapping him to the floor. After Alan admits defeat, Hatchet Josh still insists on killing the nobles. Just as Randel shields Alice from being attacked by Hatchet Josh, Mercury swoops in and steals Hatchet Josh's knife. Learning that the 4th Axe Force has mobilized the city police to mount an assault instead of a rescue mission, Oreldo and Martis are secretly authorized an acting rank by Hunks.
24	"The Military, the Commoners and the Nobility"; Transliteration: "Gunjin, Heimin, Kizoku" (Japanese: 軍人·平民·貴族)	March 17, 2007	June 23, 2010
The duel is finished when Carl's elbow is jabbed into Paulo's nose. Paulo deeply apologizes for his actions, causing Carl to stand down in remorse. Since Alice was relieved of duty for attending the ball, Oreldo and Martis use their acting rank to arrest the commoners for destruction of property. Although the commoners could only be confined for three days, Hoost gives them hope when he humbly promises to make reparations for them in due time. In the woods, Lionel challenges Carl to a duel. As Carl realizes that Lionel was the mysterious figure who previously gave him the documents, Lionel proceeds to murder Carl with his knife moments before the Emissary arrives to dispose of Carl's body. In a stagecoach, Lionel tells the Emissary and Hoost that Alice is undoubtedly his equal. Hunks informs Connery that the largest contributor of the welfare ministry is none other than Hoost. Alice believes that fairness was lost despite finding a peaceful solution. As Randel promises to always protect Alice, she takes a sip of wine and faints into his arms. The next day, Randel shows up late to work before the Pumpkin Scissors resume their war relief missions.
