= Steve Kost =

Steve Kost is an American metal artist known for his sculptures made from scrap and upcycled materials. Kost uses typewriter parts, sewing machine components, and farming tools, emphasizing themes of movement and symmetry. Kost's art has been exhibited in various regional and national venues, particularly at veteran-focused art events and institutions.

== Early life and career ==
Kost started making metal art in 2015, using parts from dismantled typewriters and sewing machines. A former U.S. Navy Seabee, he has also worked as an ironworker in Chicago. His foray into scrap metal art was inspired by his military service in Mogadishu, Somalia. Kost uses basic tools like a 110v stick welder and an angle grinder, Kost began by creating small sculptures before progressing to larger works. His art was first publicly exhibited at a Chicago veterans' art show in 2018. Since then, his sculptures have been featured in various exhibitions and festivals, often addressing themes related to veterans' experiences and mental health.

== Exhibitions ==
Kost's work has been shown in venues including:

- Illinois State Museum
- Library of Congress
- Joliet Historical Society
- National Veterans Creative Arts Festival
- ScrapFest Metal Art Festival in Lansing, Michigan

In 2024, a sculpture by Kost was featured on the Google search homepage for Veterans Day and installed at Google’s Public Sector building in Reston, Virginia.

His public installation, The Heavy Heart, is a 7-foot by 9-foot angel wing sculpture made from farming tools and local implements. It is located in Yorkville, Illinois, and serves as a memorial for departed loved ones.
