= Soil aeration =

Mechanism to introduce gases into soil

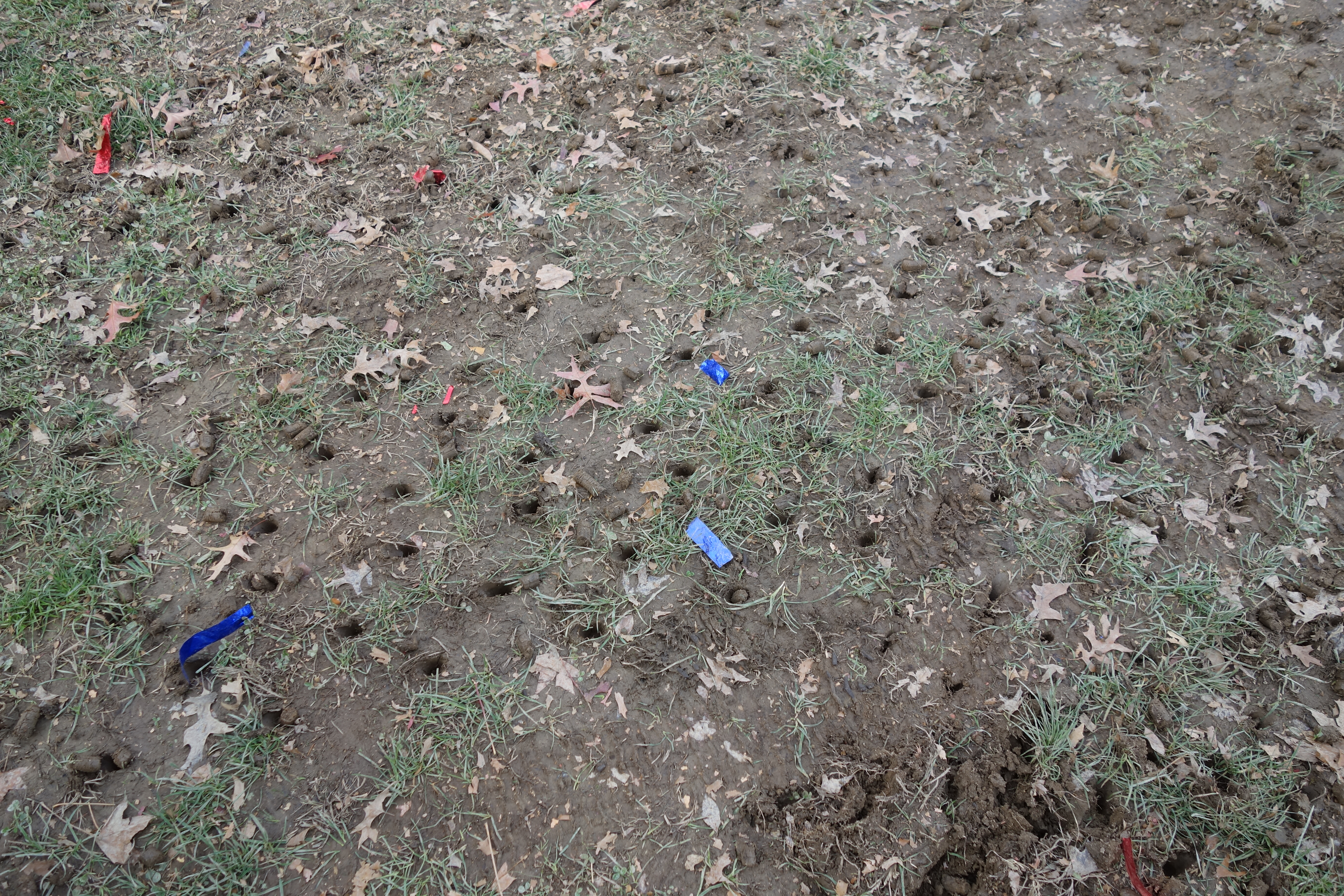
Aerated grass on a baseball field in New York City.

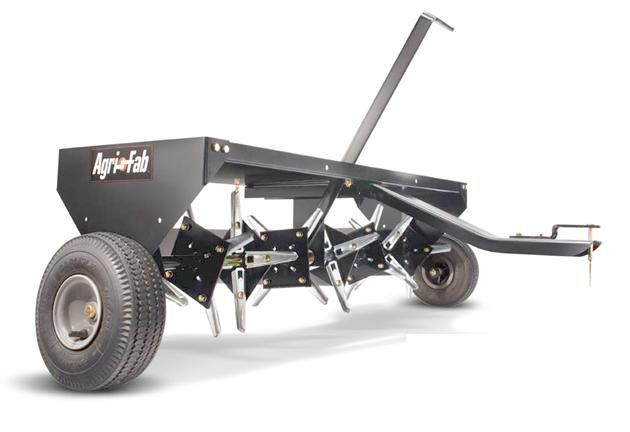
Plug/core lawn aerator.

Soil aeration is the mechanism of improving the exchange of gases between the atmosphere and soil. Through soil microbial activity and plant root respiration, certain gases such as oxygen will be depleted in the soil, while others, such as carbon dioxide, will build up in the soil. Lack of oxygen in the soil can impact plant growth. In addition to allowing the exchange of gases, soil aeration allows for water drainage and root growth. A common contributor to lack of soil aeration is soil compaction.

== Mechanical aeration ==
Soil aeration may be artificially enhanced by using mechanized or manual equipment to either puncture the soil with spikes (spike aeration) or remove approximately 1 in × 2 in (25 mm × 51 mm) cores of soil from the ground (core aeration).

Spike aeration involves the use of an aeration machine with spikes up to a foot or more in length. It is sometimes used to address drainage issues in areas with turf. Core aeration is done on turf areas as a means of reducing turf compaction, reducing thatch buildup, improving the infiltration of water/nutrients, encouraging deeper roots, and creating an environment where grass seed can have direct contact with the soil.

There are many types of lawn aerators including walk behind models, ride on versions and tractor pulled versions, as well as spiked shoes.

== Chemical aeration ==
Liquid aeration involves applying a fortified liquid solution to the lawn. Commonly, the active ingredient is ammonium lauryl sulfate. The solution breaks down dense particles in the soil and loosens it up, decreasing compaction and allowing for aeration. Liquid aeration, in combination with liquid fertilizers, is more effective at controlling soil pH when compared to core aeration.
