= Grass stitcher =

Gardening tool

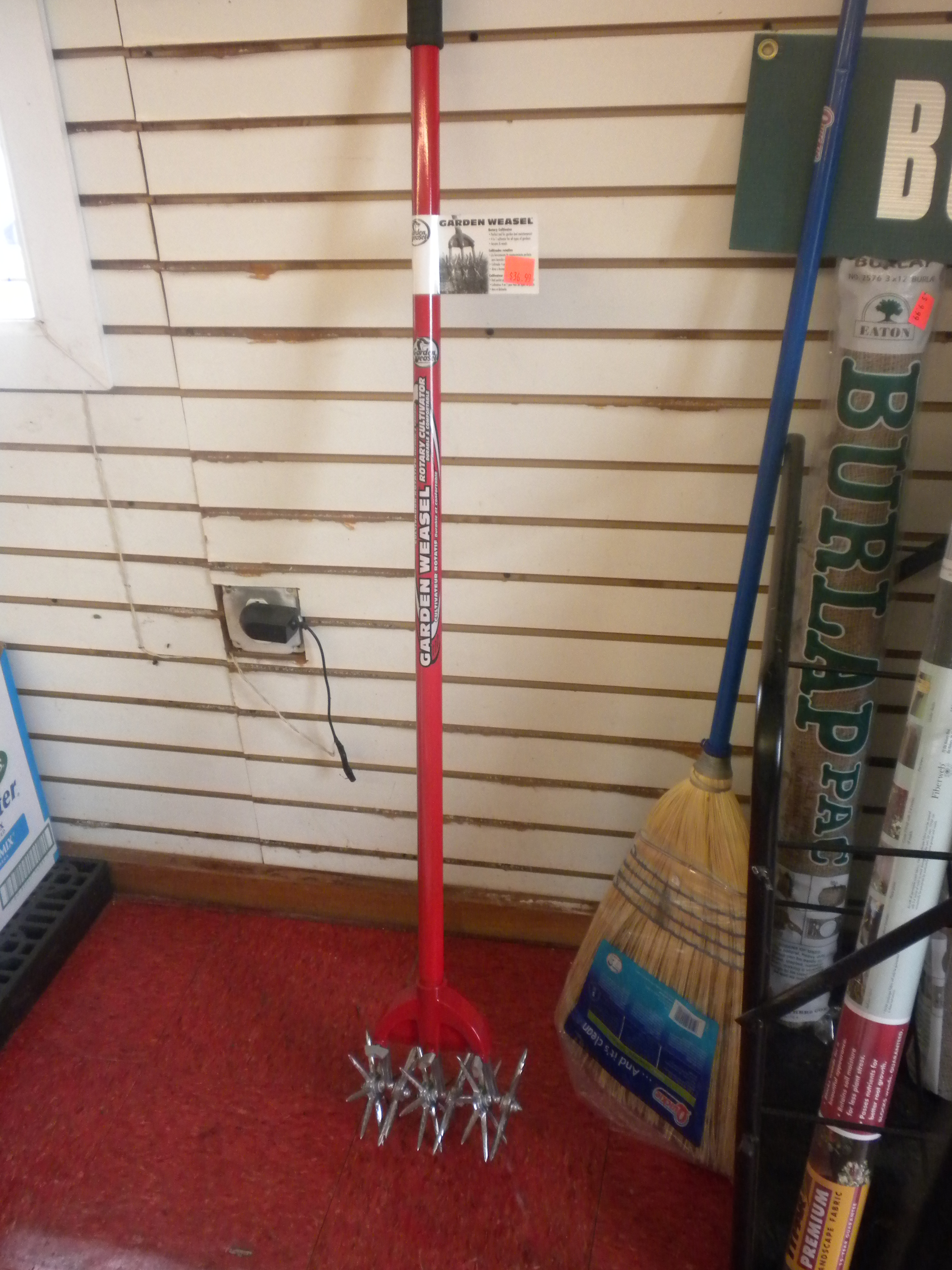
Grass stitcher

A grass stitcher is a gardening tool primarily used to repair and aerate lawns. Common uses include weed control by agitating the surface of the soil, loosening the soil, and preparing it prior to spreading grass seed. As a tool it is hand held and designed to be used while standing and have the spiked wheels pushed back and forth over the earth to be treated.

Grass stitchers are comparable to garden cultivators. While cultivators till the soil for crops or decorative plants, the grass stitcher prepares a seed bed ideal for sowing grass seed.

== See also ==
- Cultivator
- Lawn aerator
- Pitchfork
- Rake
