= Pruning shears =

Type of scissors for use with plants

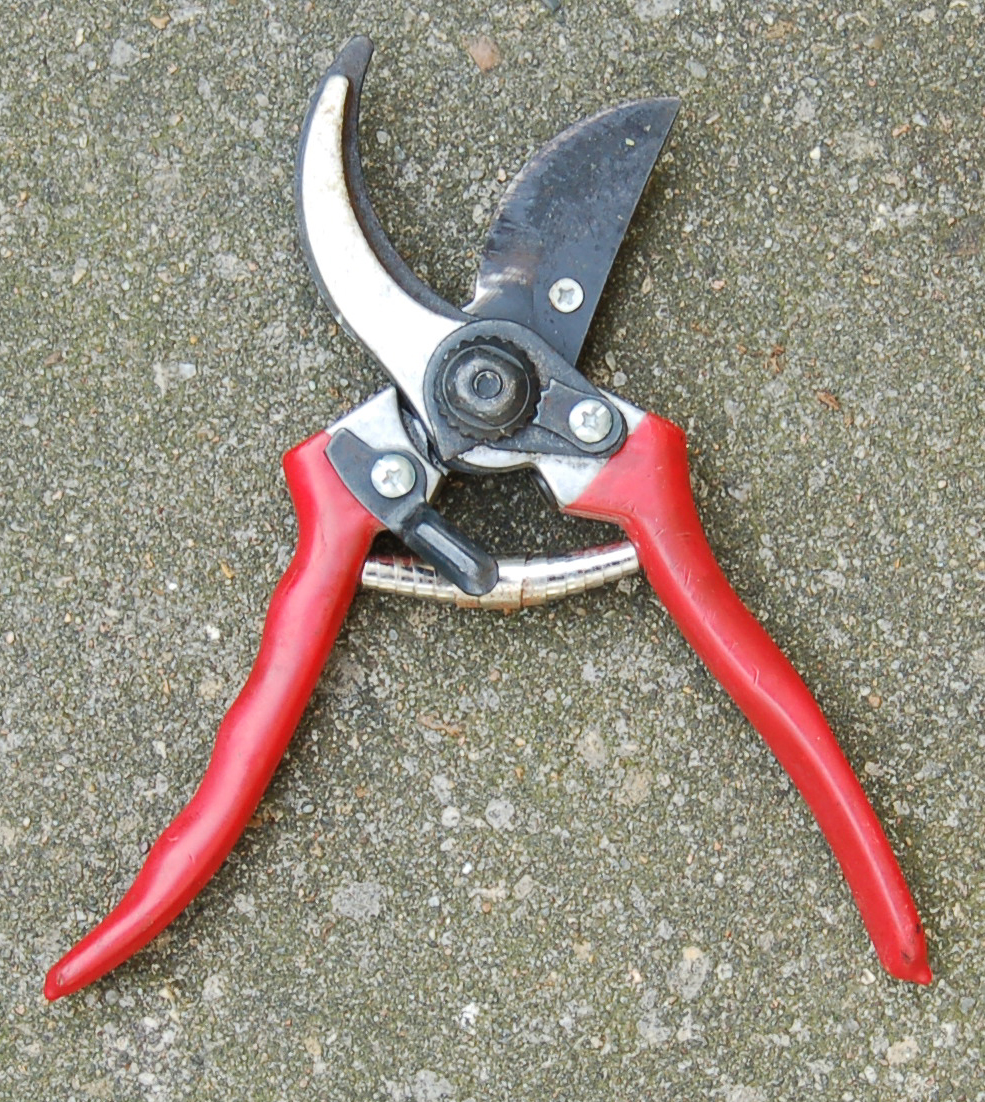
Bypass secateurs

Pruning shears, also called hand pruners (in American English) or secateurs (in British English), are a type of scissors used for plants. They are strong enough to prune hard branches of trees and shrubs, sometimes up to two centimetres thick. They are used in gardening, arboriculture, plant nursery works, farming, flower arranging, and nature conservation, where fine-scale habitat management is required. They are typically manually powered, although electric versions are available.

Loppers are a larger, two-handed, long-handled version for branches thicker than pruning shears can cut.

== History ==
Cutting plants as part of gardening dates to antiquity in both European and East Asian topiary, with specialized scissors used for Chinese penjing and its offshoots – Japanese bonsai and Vietnamese Hòn Non-Bộ – for over a thousand years.

In modern Europe, scissors only used for gardening work have existed since the early 1800s, when the French aristocrat Antoine-François Bertrand de Molleville was listed as the inventor of the secateurs in Figures pour l’almanach du bon jardinier: Répresentant les Utensiles le plus généralement employés dans la culture des Jardins, published in 1813. During the late 1890s, secateurs were sold all over Europe and the US. Today secateurs are widely used by gardeners, vintners and fruit farmers.

The world's first anvil pruners were developed and produced in 1923 by Walther Schröder in Kiel, Germany. The pruners were given the product name "Original LÖWE" and were distributed internationally as far back as 1925. Other companies producing anvil pruners include Bahco, Edma, Felco, Fiskars Gardena and Wolf Garten.

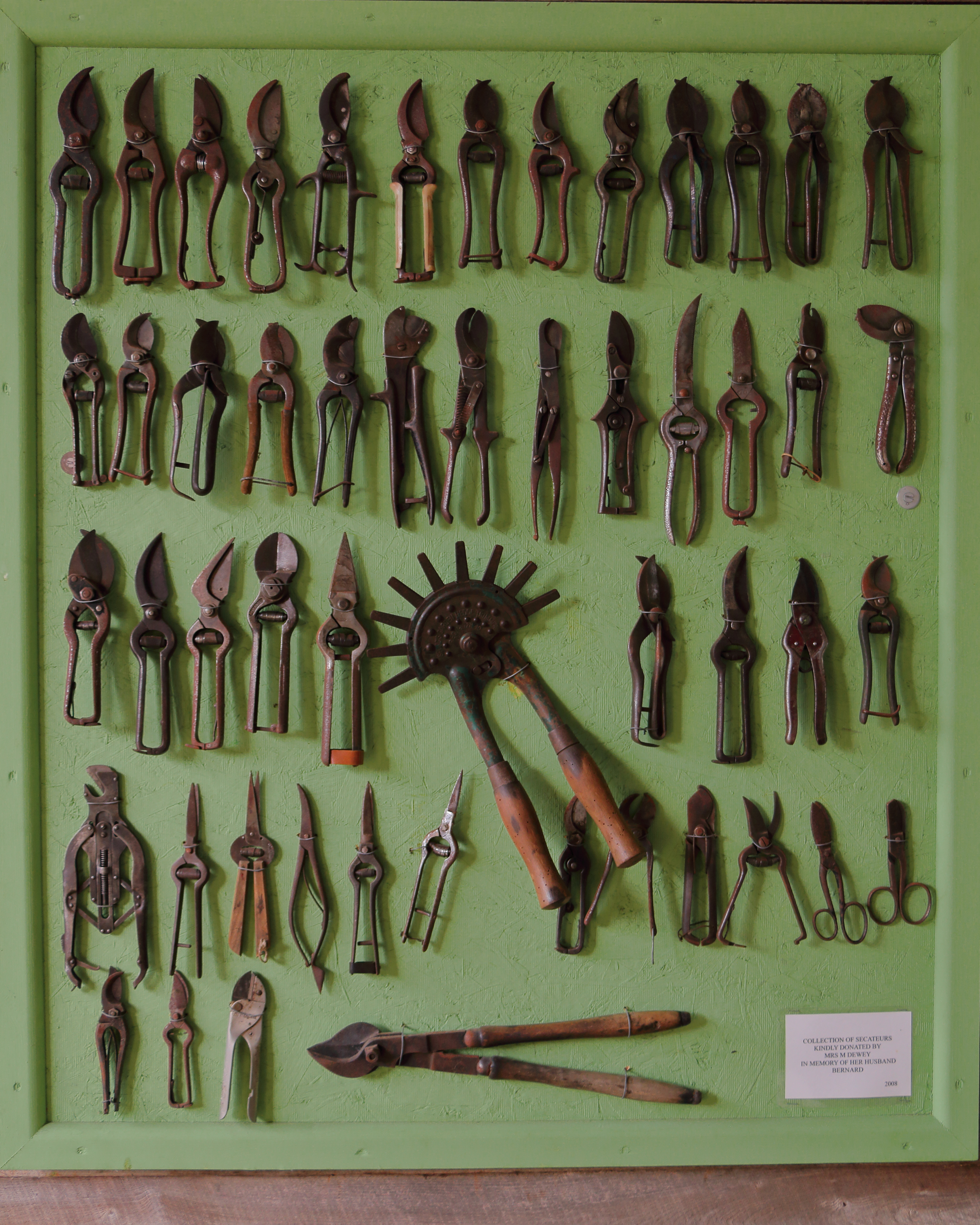
Collection of secateurs at Breamore House.

An extensive collection of historical variants of secateurs can be seen at Breamore House, Hampshire, England. They are housed in their countryside museum.

== Designs ==
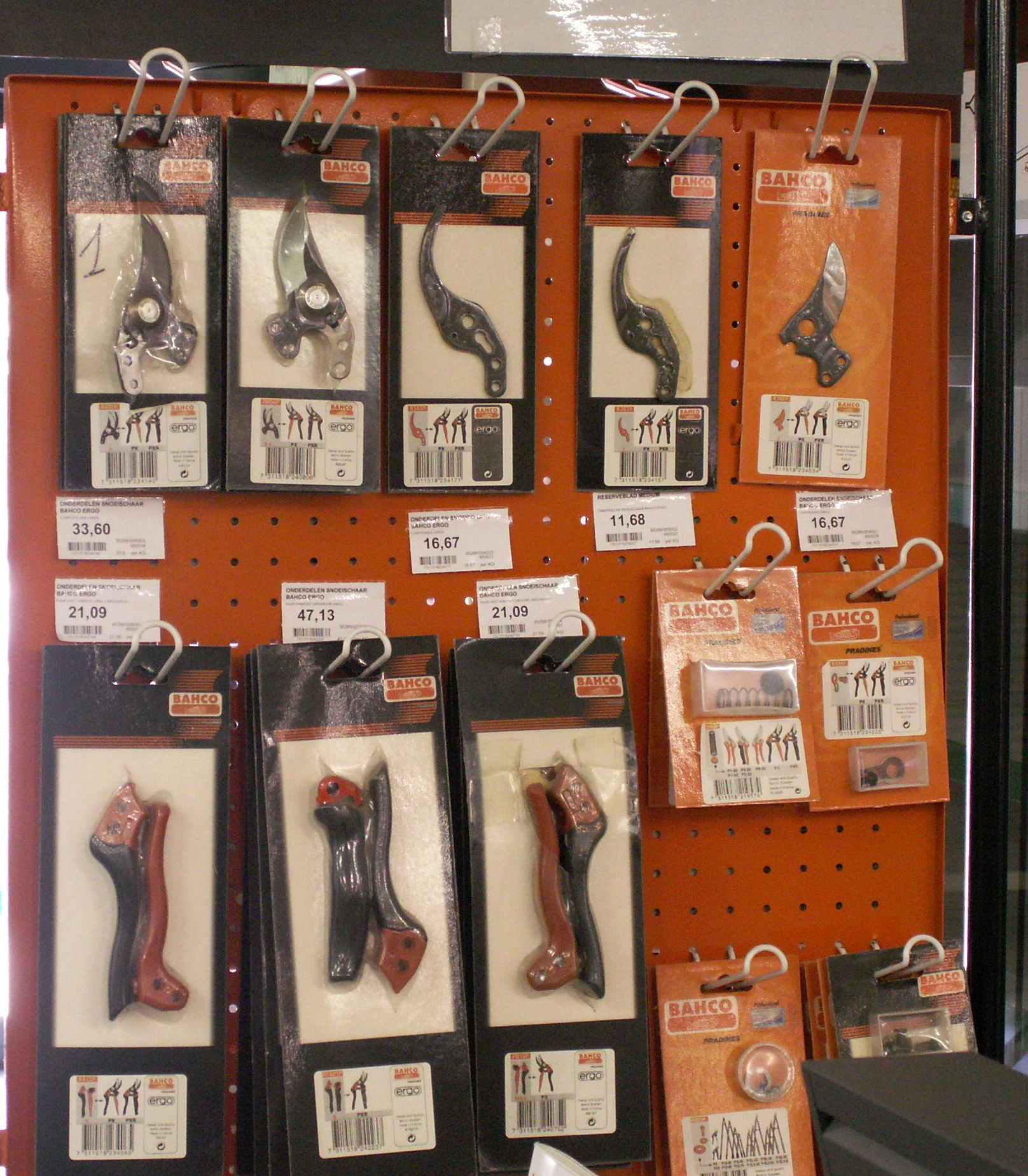
Professional pruning shears often have replaceable blades

There are three different blade designs for pruning shears: anvil, bypass and parrot-beak.

Anvil pruners have only one blade, which closes onto a flat surface; unlike bypass blades it can be sharpened from both sides and remains reliable when slightly blunt. Anvil pruners are useful for cutting thick branches; one can bite into the stem from one direction, swing the handle around and bite further through narrowed wood from another direction. The anvil is made of a material softer than the blade, so that the blade is not damaged when it meets the anvil. Suitable materials for the anvil are plastic, aluminum, zinc, brass, or bronze alloys. The blades are made from hardened carbon or chromium steels. The hardness of the blades is generally between 54 and 58 HRC. On an anvil pruner, proper cutting is assured even if the blade swerves slightly to the left or right during cutting. As long as the blade meets the anvil at the end of the cut and fits tightly against it, the material is separated. For this reason, the blades of anvil pruners can be ground thinner than those on bypass pruners. The LÖWE principle – a drawing cut made against a fixed support – combines a drawing cut with a pushing cut. This is possible because the blade lever and base lever are connected by an eccentric bearing. When the pruners are open, the blade is longer than the anvil thanks to the eccentric bearing. When the pruners close, the blade draws back slightly while it pushes through the material. This reduces the cutting force needed to make a cut still further. Because they crush the stem they are cutting, anvil pruners are best for use on dead wood.

Bypass pruners usually work exactly like a pair of scissors, with two blades "passing by" each other to make the cut. At least one of the blades will be curved: a convex upper blade with either a concave or straight lower one. Some bypass designs have only one blade, the lower jaw being broad (like an anvil) but passing the upper jaw. The ratchet pruner, which can handle stems thicker than two centimetres, fits in this category. Because they make a clean cut without crushing, bypass pruners are preferable for pruning live wood.

Parrot-beak pruners consist of two concave passing blades, which trap the stem between them to make the cut. These are suitable only for narrower stems.

== Handle length ==
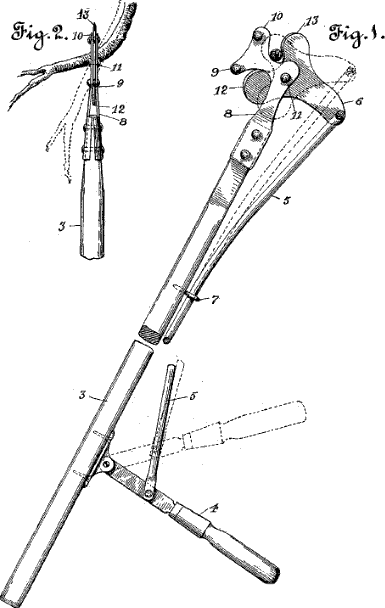
Fig.1 shows the handle and head of an averruncator. Fig. 2 shows the head in use.

Secateurs have short handles and are operated with one hand. A spring between the handles causes the jaws to open again after closing. When not in use, the jaws may be held closed by a safety catch or by a loop holding the handles together. Some types are designed for right-handed or left-handed use only, and some incorporate a rotating handle to reduce friction and minimize hand stress during repetitive use. There are also longer versions called telescopic pruners, which are adjustable for long-reach and operate by means of a rod system inside of a telescoping pole between the handles and the blades. An early version of these was known as an averruncator.

== Type of blades ==
There are two different types of blades for pruning shears: Stainless steel and carbon steel.

In addition there are pruning shears that have titanium coating.

Stainless steel have a high corrosion resistance, due to the protective chromium oxide layer that covers the steel surface after heat treatment. On the other hand, they are not sharp for long.

Carbon steel has a higher carbon content, which gives the steel a lower melting point, more malleability and durability, and better heat distribution. The disadvantages are the quick corrosion and staining.

Titanium coated blades offer a balance between durability, sharpness and anti-corrosion. Titanium is stronger, has higher corrosion resistance, and has about half the density (weight) of steel. The titanium coating helps strengthen the blade and prevent corrosion, and after being sharpened a few times it will expose the steel edge underneath, giving the best edge with higher strength and resistance to corrosion over the length of the blade. The titanium coating is recognized by the gold colored blade as opposed to the typical silver colored steel blade.

== See also ==
- Garden tool
