= Agricultural waste =

Material discarded as a byproduct of agriculture

Agricultural waste are plant residues from agriculture. These waste streams originate from arable land and horticulture. Agricultural waste comprises all parts of crops that are not used for human or animal food. Crop residues consist mainly of stems, branches (in pruning), and leaves. It is estimated that, on average, 80% of the plant of such crops consists of agricultural waste.

The four most commonly grown agricultural crops worldwide are sugarcane, maize, cereals and rice. The total weight of all these crops is more than 16,500 billion kilograms per year. Since 80% of this consists of agricultural waste, many tens of thousands of billions of kilograms of agricultural waste remain worldwide. Some 700 million tonnes of agricultural waste is produced annually by the EU.

== Recycling agricultural waste ==
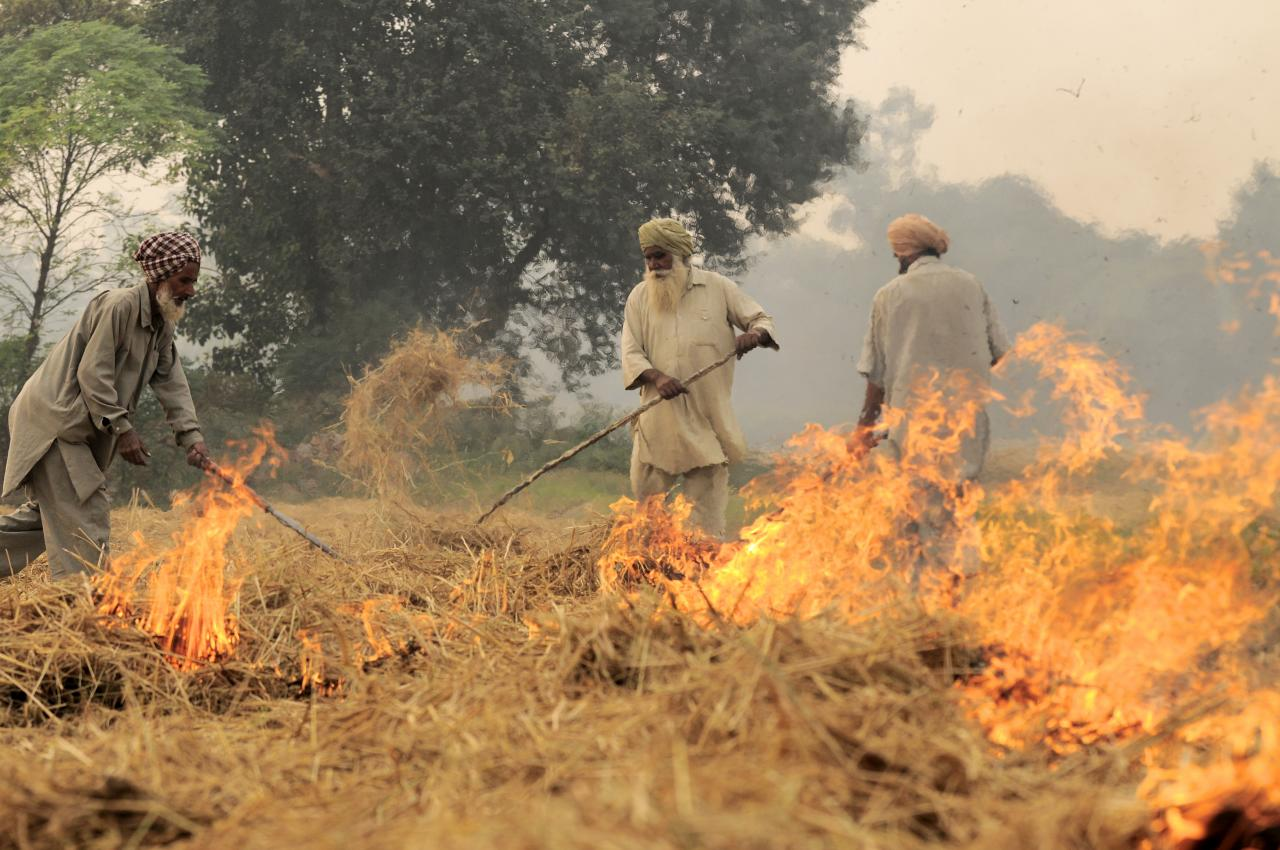
Burning of rice residues in southeast Punjab, India, prior to wheat season

Agricultural waste consists mainly of cellulose, hemicellulose and lignin. Agricultural waste is poorly digestible and in unprocessed form not widely suitable as animal feed.

Sometimes, agricultural waste is burnt, either as biomass in power plants or simply on land. Burning agricultural waste on land is called stubble burning and is still common in countries like China and India where a third of the world's population lives. Then, instead of being reused to make new products, valuable substances in agricultural waste are turned into CO_{2}, smog, particulate matter and ash.

Today, burning of agricultural waste is increasingly banned and pruning biomass is used for applications, including woodchipper for bedding soils. Three categories of substances are mainly extracted from agricultural waste: proteins, materials containing cellulose and bioactive substances such as essential oils and carotenoids. The increasing ability to isolate such valuable substances in a pure form increases the economic value of agricultural waste.

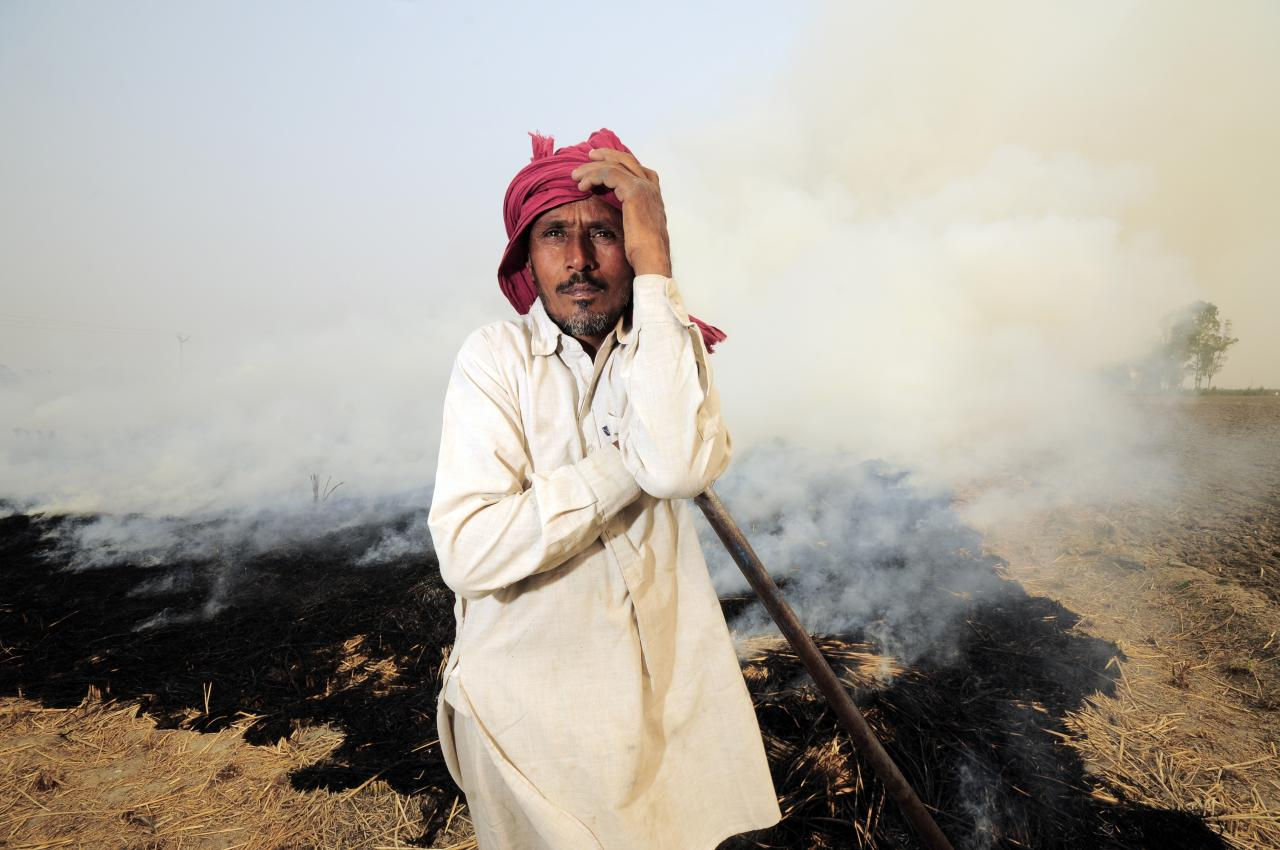
Farmer burning, on a large scale, pruning and agricultural waste, leading to smog and loss of organic matter, among other things

== Impact of agricultural waste on the environment ==
The world's population and livestock size is growing and that is where the rising demand for food comes from. The average European is expected to consume 165 grams of meat per person daily. People around the world consume an average of 75 pounds of meat per person per year. Global meat consumption has more than doubled since 1990. Producing 1 kg (2.2 lb) of beef requires an average of 25 kg (55 lb) of crop. The production of all this food also results in more and more agricultural waste.

In large quantities, agricultural waste can have a negative impact on the environment and habitat, for example through greenhouse gas emissions, the creation of unpleasant odours, and toxic liquids that can infiltrate water sources.

The frequent and large-scale burning of agricultural waste also has negative health impacts on people who are exposed to toxic smog through the fires. Particularly in early autumn, large-scale burning of agricultural wastes worldwide results in frequent smog.

The World Health Organisation (WHO) identifies smog due to agricultural waste burning as one of the largest sources of ambient air pollution. All forms of air pollution combined cause 7 million deaths annually, including 650,000 children.

Schematic representation of the waste hierarchy, a waste management standard

Besides the impact on air quality, burning of agricultural waste in fields also has a negative impact on soil fertility, economic development and climate. The absence of environmentally friendly agricultural waste management further leads to animal suffering, water pollution, fertilisation, and decline in biodiversity, among others.

According to the waste hierarchy, burning agricultural waste for the sake of energy generation is a less environmentally friendly treatment method than recycling or reusing it. Moreover, incineration for energy generation can be done once, while consumer goods (such as paper made from agricultural waste) can be recycled another seven times. After this, it can possibly still be burned for energy, or even converted into biogas or compost through fermentation.

In an effort to reduce the negative impact of agricultural waste on earth, some companies have focused on developing new technologies that allow agricultural waste to be put to meaningful use and returning to traditional non-combustion use.

== Agricultural burning in California ==
California accepts burning as a tool to remove weeds, prevent disease and control pests, especially for rice and pears. Burning is allowed in Permissive Burn Days.

== Applications ==
Several companies worldwide use leftover agricultural waste to make new products. Reusing agricultural waste is in line with the desired circular economy. In today's economy, primary raw materials are mostly used. Agricultural waste, on the other hand, is a secondary raw material. They are residual (waste) streams from an existing industry that can serve as raw materials for new applications. Increasingly reusing materials as raw materials for the production process contributes to the EU goal of achieving a circular economy by 2050.

=== Fiberboard ===
CalFibre from USA has developed and built the world's first rice straw-based medium density fiberboard (MDF) plant, located in Willows, CA. By utilizing rice straw instead of timber, CalFibre spares the equivalent of 4,200 acres of forest (roughly 180,000 metric tons of wood) from logging, with the harvesting and transportation of such emitting 150,000 tons of CO_{2} equivalent. Additionally, preventing rice straw decomposition eliminates 66,000 tons of methane gas each year, equivalent to around 1.848 million tons of CO_{2}. This approach also saves up to 18 billion gallons of water annually (meeting the yearly water requirements of 500,000 Bay Area residents) and curtails 1.4 million tons of CO_{2} emissions linked with water management. The second plant is currently being built in Egypt.

=== Paper and board ===
Agricultural waste is used as a raw material for sustainable paper and board by the company PaperWise. The stalks and leaves that remain after harvesting are processed into raw material for paper and board. With PaperWise, the cellulose needed for paper is extracted from agricultural waste. This replaces the proportion of cellulose fibres from trees, meaning that these trees do not need to be cut down for paper production, but can be left to absorb CO_{2} and convert it into oxygen. Made from agricultural waste, this paper and board meets high quality standards and is available as printing paper, among other things. It is also used for sustainable packaging and eco-friendly office products.

=== Bio-based oil ===
Vertoro is a spin-off of a public–private partnership between Brightlands Chemelot Campus, DSM, Chemelot InSciTe, Maastricht University (UM) and Eindhoven University of Technology (TU/e), which are making 100% bio-based oil from agricultural waste, among other things, as an alternative to fossil oil.

=== Leather ===
Fruitleather Rotterdam makes handbags and shoes based on discarded fruit. Because 40% does not meet the requirements of supermarket chains, for example a crooked cucumber or a slightly deformed tomato, a lot of fruit goes to waste. Fruitleather Rotterdam has therefore developed an eco-friendly production process that converts fruit waste into sustainable leather-like material.

=== Catering disposables ===
Eco-Products from the USA sell catering disposables based on various agricultural waste streams. These disposables are used for events, parties and single-use circumstances.

=== Fuel ===
In Finland, the joint venture Suomen Lantakaasu has been established by dairy producer Valio and energy company St1 to produce sustainable transport fuel. This uses a biogas plant fed by manure and agricultural waste from Finland.

=== Plastic ===
PlasticFri is a Swedish startup that produces sustainable biocomposites. The startup's proprietary technology extracts fibrous materials from agricultural waste and non-edible plants to create an eco-friendly plastic alternative. PlasticFri's material contains no harmful substances and is fully biodegradable.

== Awareness ==
Most farmers in developing countries are not aware of the alternative applications and therefore consider burning as the best option. Therefore, large-scale awareness programmes are needed to;

- Recognise agricultural waste as a waste stream.
- Educate on the adverse effects of low-grade waste treatment methods such as incineration and landfill.
- Educate farmers on the availability of economically viable options higher up the waste hierarchy and their benefits to themselves and the environment.

== See also ==
- Environmental monitoring
- Eutrophication
- Plastic pollution
- Plasticulture
- Pruning
