= Loppers =

Tool for pruning twigs and branches

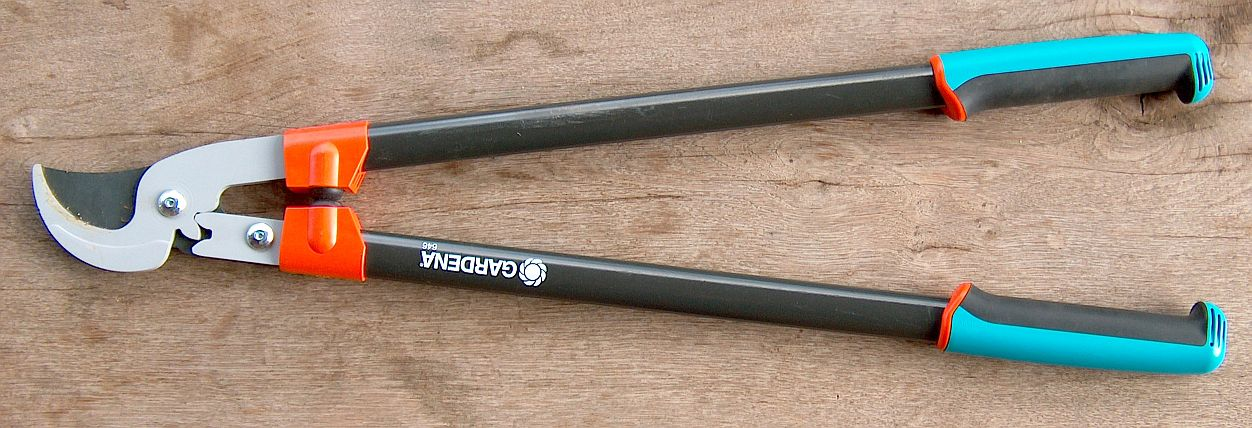
Bypass loppers with double curved blades

Loppers are a type of scissors used for pruning twigs and small branches, like pruning shears with longer handles. They are a larger type of manual garden cutting tool, but not as long as pole pruners (averruncators in British English).

Loppers are usually operated with two hands, and have handles typically between 30 centimetres (12 in) and 91 centimetres (36 in) long to give good leverage. Some have telescopic handles which can be extended to a length of 2 m (6.6 ft), in order to increase leverage and to reach high branches on a tree. Loppers are mainly used for the pruning of tree branches with diameters less than 5 centimetres (2 in). Some of the newer lopper designs have a gear system, a compound lever system, or a ratchet drive, which increases the force applied to the blades.

== Etymology ==
The word lopper can be used in the singular or the plural, with precisely the same meaning. The plural form, most common in speech but less so in print, is a plurale tantum, and seems to be on the model of a pair of scissors. The name of the tool is derived from the verb "to lop", meaning to cut off (especially branches or twigs), which in turn is related to a noun of precisely the same form: a "lop" is a period or session of branch cutting. The noun and verb first appeared in Middle English as loppe, but have no known antecedents or cognates in other languages.

== Construction ==
The two main types of loppers are the "bypass" type, which is better for cutting live wood, and the "anvil" type which is better for cutting dead wood.

Bypass loppers operate like scissors, except that they generally only have one blade that moves past a jaw or hook that has an approximately square edge that is not typically sharpened and is usually concave or hook shaped in order keep branches from slipping out of the jaws. The jaws of bypass loppers may be straight, curved, or one curved with one straight.

Anvil loppers have a single sharpened blade, with a straight or sometimes curved edge, that closes against a similarly contoured flat anvil like surface on the other side of the jaws, usually made of a softer metal than the blade. Anvil loppers have the disadvantage of tending to crush rather than cut, sometimes leaving an untidy wound, more vulnerable to infection. Their main advantages are of relative strength and of being less likely to jam with fibrous material. Very hard or resilient branches can sometimes deflect a bypass lopper so that material either binds between the blades or even levers them apart, which can be dangerous both to the tool and the operator.

Both types of lopper generally have a sprung adjusting screw at the fulcrum, which can be used to tighten the blades as they loosen in use. With bypass loppers, it is also useful for releasing material jamming the blades. Anvil loppers usually have a screw for adjusting or detaching the plate, so that it can be moved to compensate for wear or replaced entirely.

== See also ==
- Hedge trimmer—A similar tool for thinner vegetation
- Pruning shears (secateurs)—smaller garden cutting tools usually operated with one hand
