= Lawn aerator =

Lawn machine

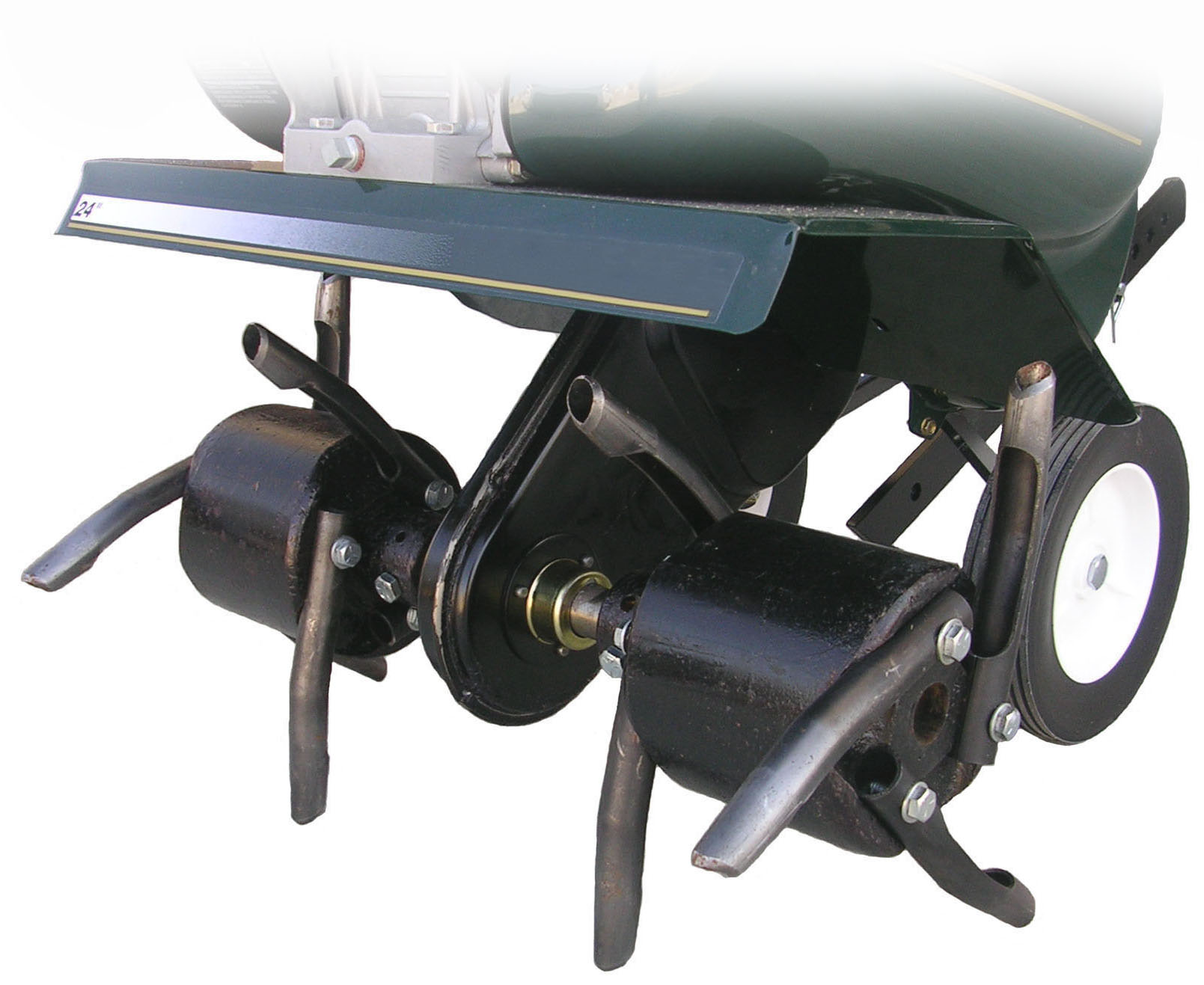
Core lawn aerator attachment on a conventional front-tine garden tiller

A lawn aerator is a garden tool designed to create holes in the soil in order to help lawn grasses grow. In compacted lawns, aeration improves soil drainage and encourages worms, microfauna and microflora which require oxygen.

== Lawn problems ==
Lawn aeration involves controlling lawn thatch and reducing soil compaction, making grass roots multiply. Aerating either by coring or spiking causes the roots to divide or sever apart, which rarely happens naturally. Severing the roots causes them to multiply and thus the blades of grass multiply, keeping the lawn thick and deeply rooted as the holes become engorged with roots. Lawn thatch is a layer of dead organic tissue that can protect the lawn by moderating temperature and reducing evapotranspiration when it is a reasonable thickness, but too much thatch can limit soil oxygenation and reduce watering effectiveness. Soil compaction makes it difficult for grass to develop long roots and disturbs both natural rainwater and artificial irrigation.

== Types of aerators ==
There are two types of lawn aerators:

1. spike aerators use wedge shaped solid spikes to punch holes in the soil
2. core aerators have hollow tines that pull out plugs (or "cores") from soil

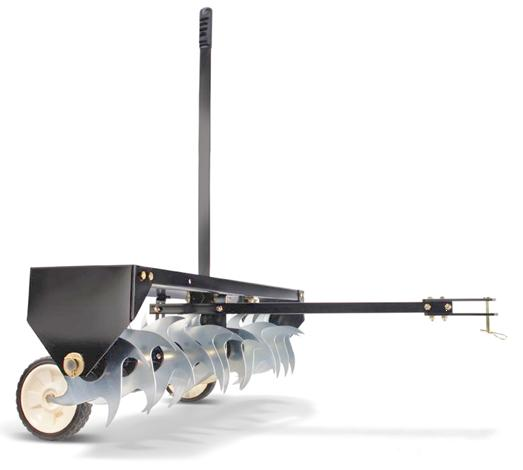
Curved spike aerator

Core/plug aerator vs. spike aerator

A spike aerator creates holes in the ground by pushing the soil sideways as wedge-shaped spikes penetrate the soil. Since there is no soil removed from the ground, watering will cause the compacted soil around the holes to expand and close. A core/plug aerator removes soil from the ground and leaves the core on the turf. This reduces compaction in the soil, and the holes can stay open for a long time allowing air, fertilisers, and water to reach the roots. Core aeration is suitable for heavy clay soils, and spike aeration is more suited to sandy or loamy soils.

Powered aerator vs. manual aerator

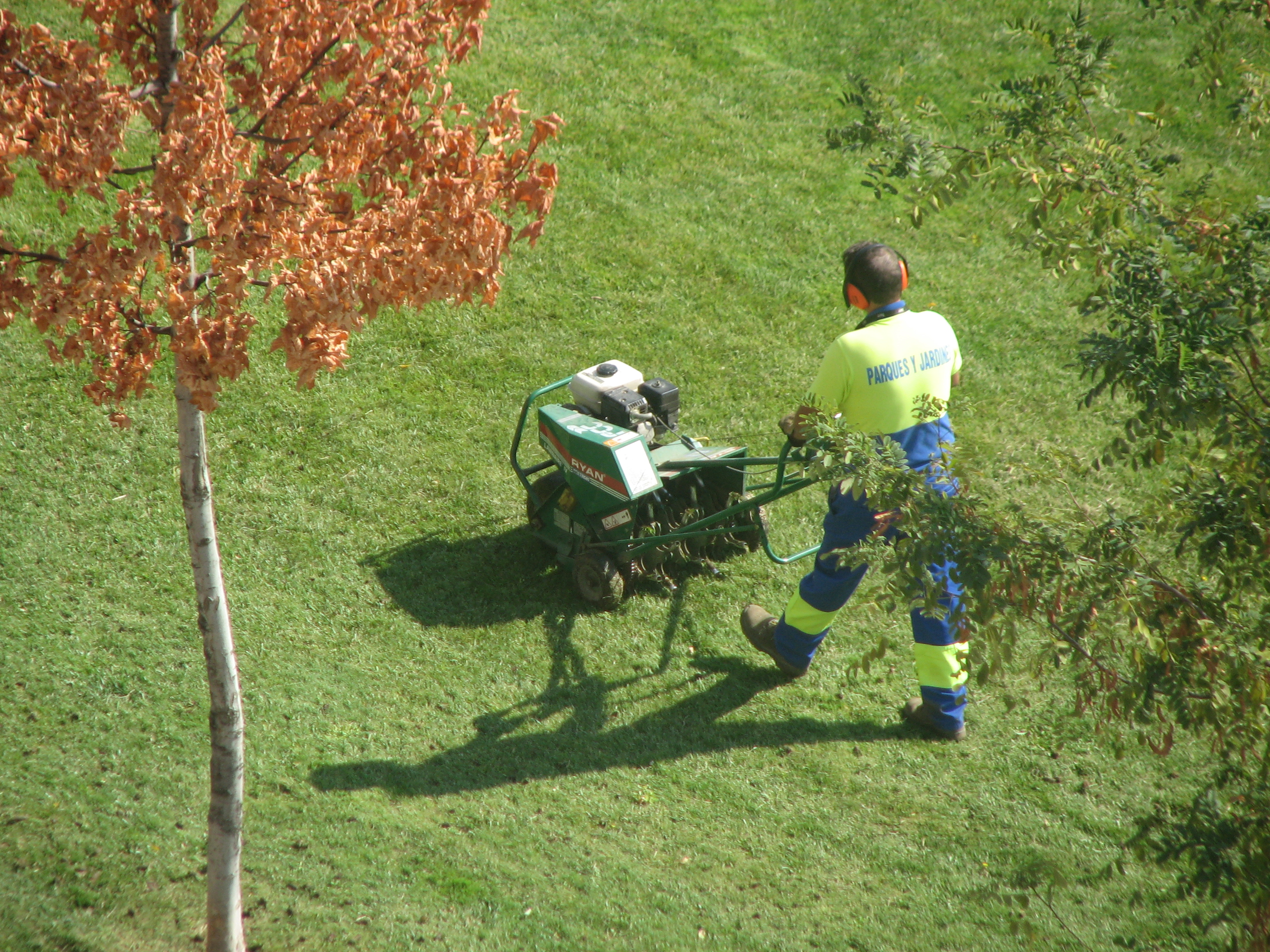
Powered core aerator in use

Powered aerators employ the power from ground propulsion to drive multiple tines into ground. The machines can aerate a large lawn in a relatively short time (similar to mowing speed).

Manual aerators usually have two to five hollow tines mounted on a step bar. The operator puts one foot on the step bar and push it downward, forcing the tines to penetrate into the soil. Then he pulls the handle on the step bar upward to remove the soil cores out of the ground. By repeating the same operation, the cores left in the tines will be pushed out by the next ones. Manual aerators are much cheaper than powered ones. The trade-off is the speed. For a typical residential lawn (1/4 acre lot), it will take hours to finish. Some products also have issues with the tines becoming clogged with soil, which can slow down the operation even more. However, a well-made manual aerator offers advantages such as ease of use, selective aeration, and economy.

== Guidelines ==
Grass type determines the best time of year for aeration. Cool-season grasses (bluegrass, fescue and ryegrass) should be aerated in early spring or fall (March, April or September). Warm-season grasses (Bermudagrass, buffalograss, zoysiagrass) should be aerated in May through July.

It is recommend to space aerator holes 3 inches or less apart. Given the spacing of tines on many aerator machines this means several passes could be necessary.

== See also ==
- Grass stitcher
