= Tree topping =

Practice of removing whole tops of trees

Tree topping is the practice of removing whole tops of trees or large branches and/or trunks from the tops of trees, leaving stubs or lateral branches that are too small to assume the role of a terminal leader. Other common names for the practice include hat-racking, heading, rounding over, and tipping. Some species of trees are more likely to recover from topping than others. There are alternatives to topping that can help to achieve the same goals without damaging trees.

== Purpose ==
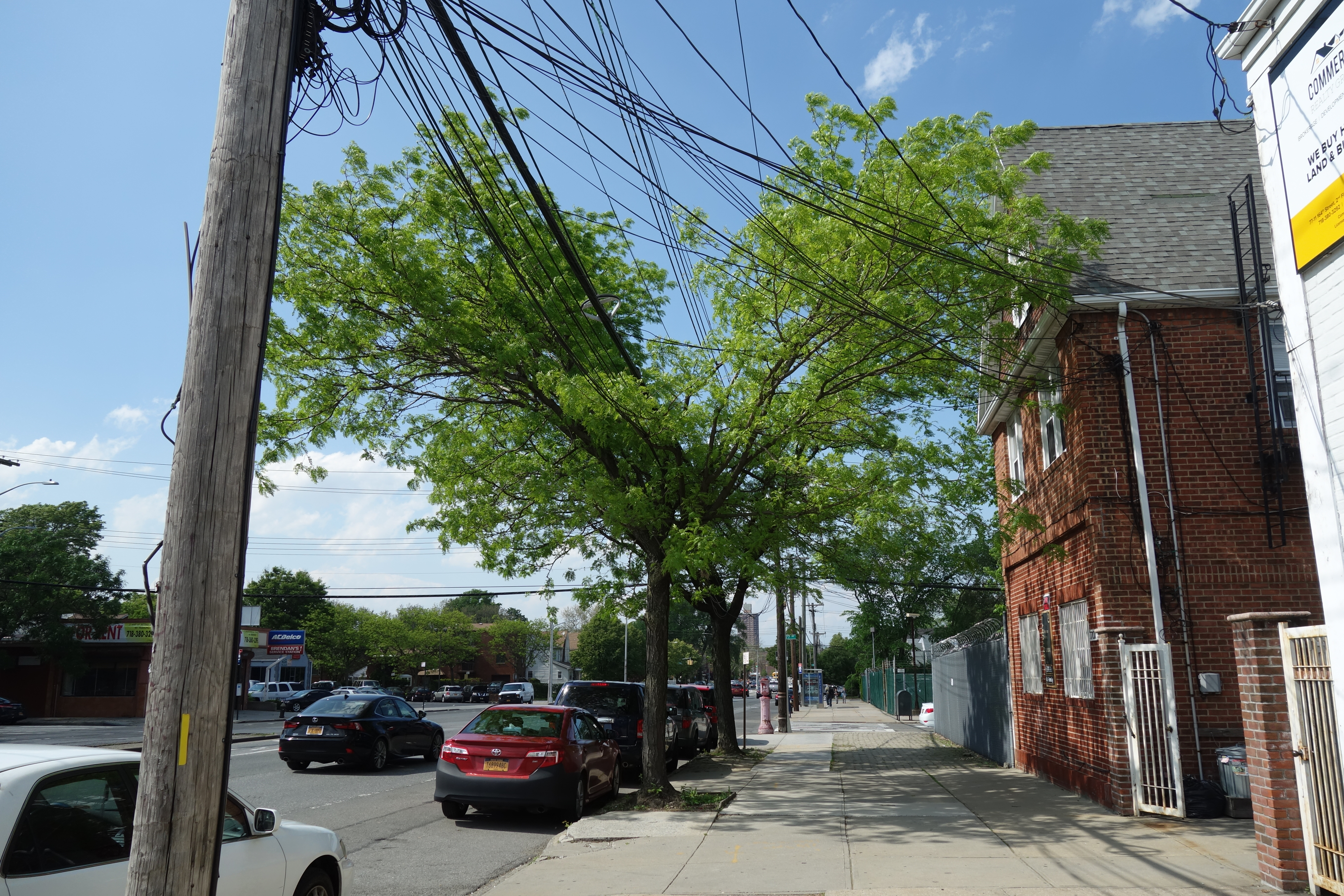
This tree was topped to accommodate electrical and telephone wires.

Hundreds of large trees are topped each year, which causes significant stress and future safety issues. It has been shown through survey that the average person's knowledge on tree care is limited.

Another popular misconception is that a topped tree will benefit from increased light penetration. The removal of a large portion of a tree's canopy can have detrimental effects. When a tree is topped, newly formed bark may be susceptible to sun scald. Prolonged exposure can severely damage the bark, thus creating an attractive home for decay-causing organisms. Evidence of decay may be the presence of conks (fungal fruiting structures) on the outer tree bark. The loss of leaves reduces a tree's ability to photosynthesize and produce food. If a large tree is unable to produce enough sugars to feed the roots, it will slowly die from starvation.

Some people have been known to top trees in order to stimulate new growth. When a tree is topped, many adventitious shoots, known as suckers begin to grow from the wound. This is the tree's response to the sudden loss of leaves. Although the tree is able to produce an abundance of suckers, they are susceptible to numerous problems. Firstly, this adventitious growth is succulent and susceptible to attacks by insects such as aphids and caterpillars, and pathogens like fire blight (Rosaceae). Secondly, the branch-stubs that the suckers emerge from are rarely able to form a complete callus. This means that any pathogen that attacks a sucker may enter the tree directly through the open wound. If wood begins to rot it could create a weak branch connection between the developing suckers and the main tree leading to a possible branch failure. If a tree is unable to compartmentalize the fungi, it may reach the trunk and ultimately kill the tree.

Aesthetics is another reason why people hire arborists to top their trees. A tree may be blocking the mountain view, shading the garden, or interfering with solar energy collection. As a result, the tree never fully returns to its initial natural form.

Topped trees

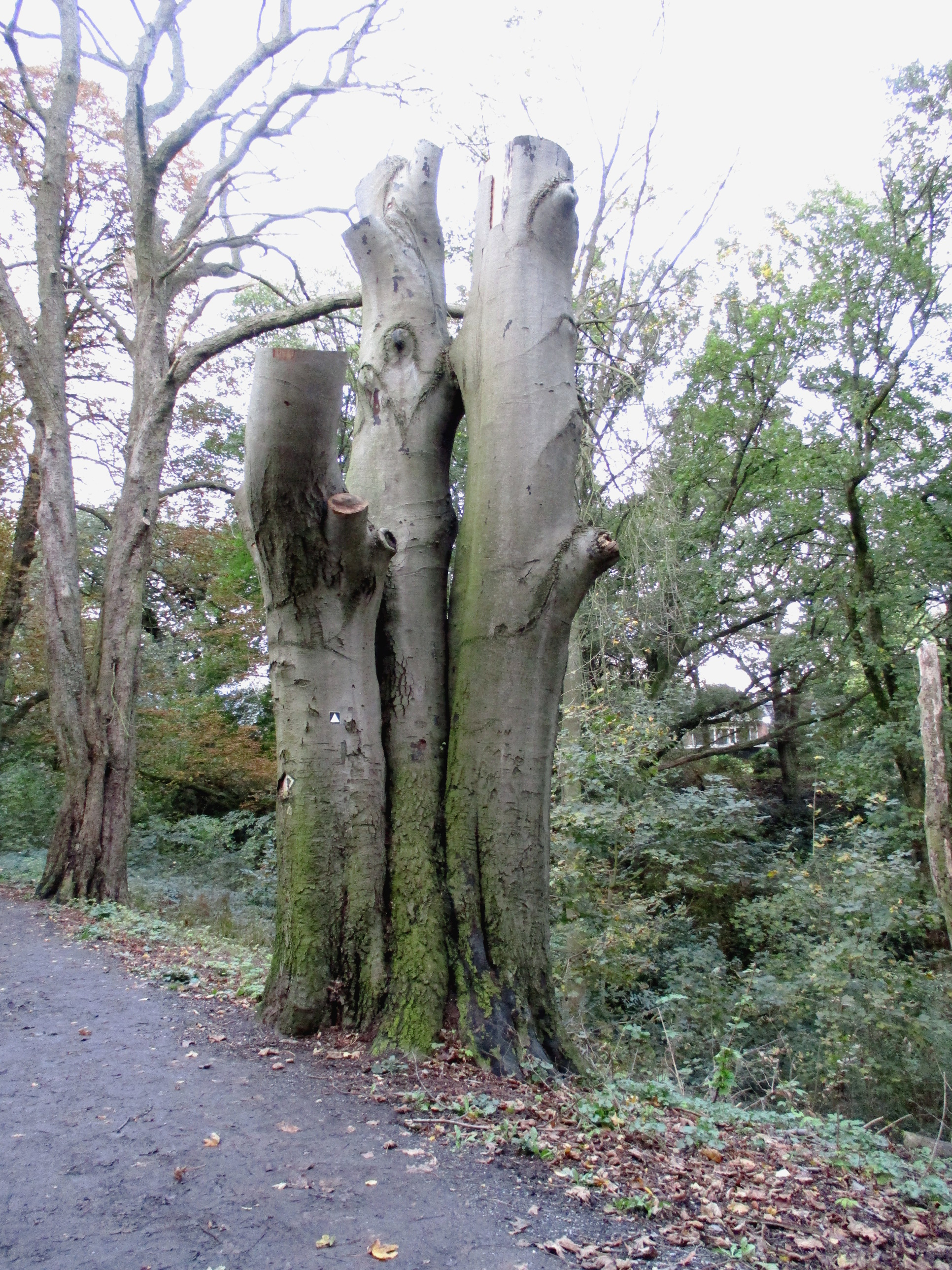
A dead tree, topped

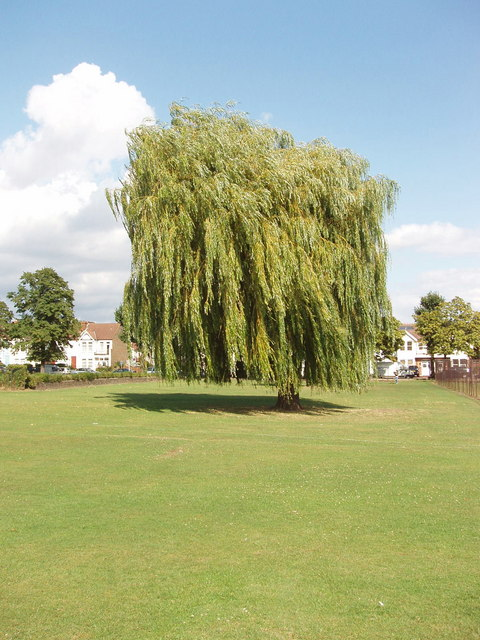
Weeping willow before topping and pruning

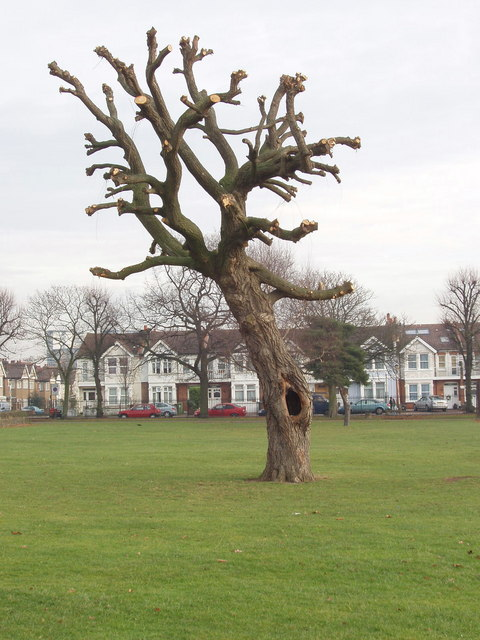
Same tree, after topping and pruning

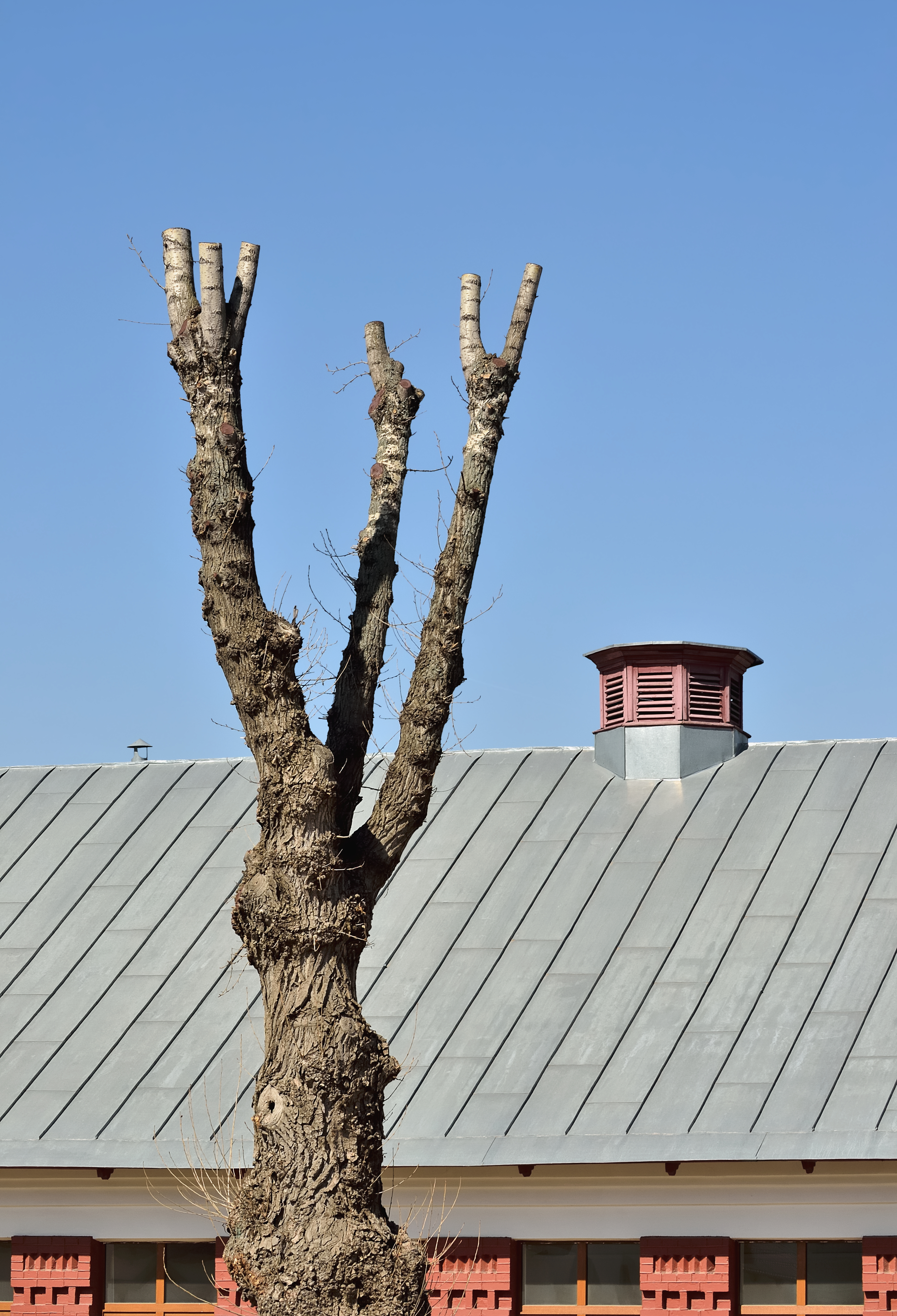
Three-branched tree, topped

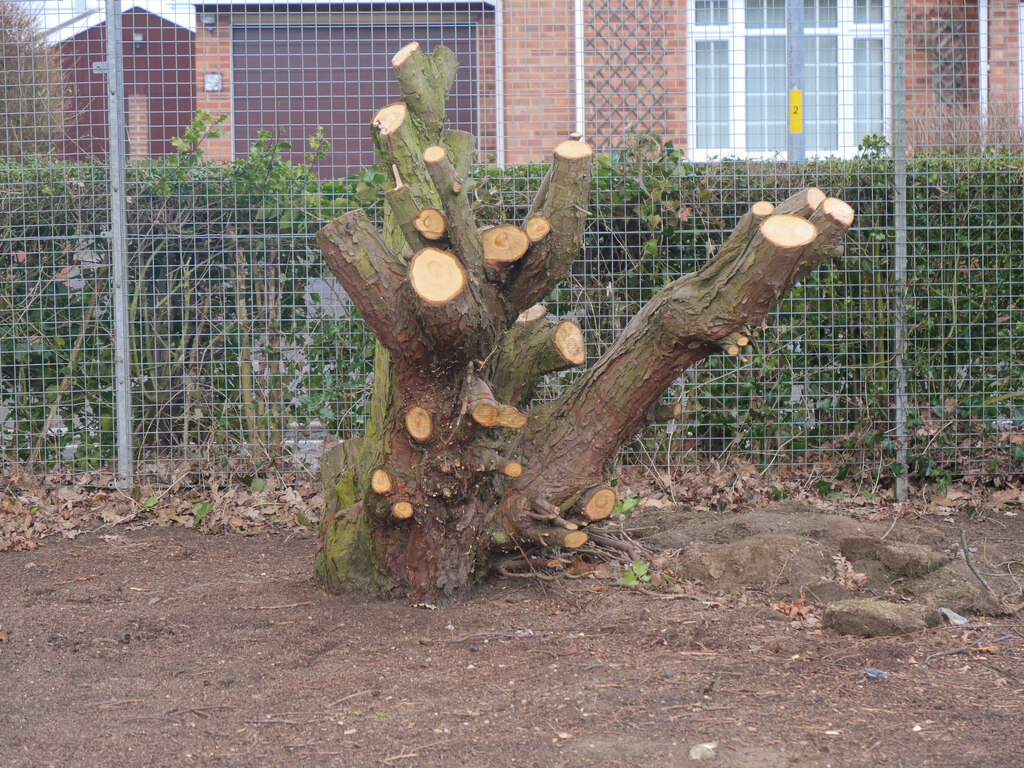
Coppicing (shown here) is similar to topping and pollarding.

== Topping precautions ==
Large pruning wounds, such as those left behind in trees after topping, may become entry points for pathogens and may result in extensive decay. Decay undermines, to greater or lesser extent, the long-term health and physical stability of trees; most notably in those species which compartmentalize decay less effectively.

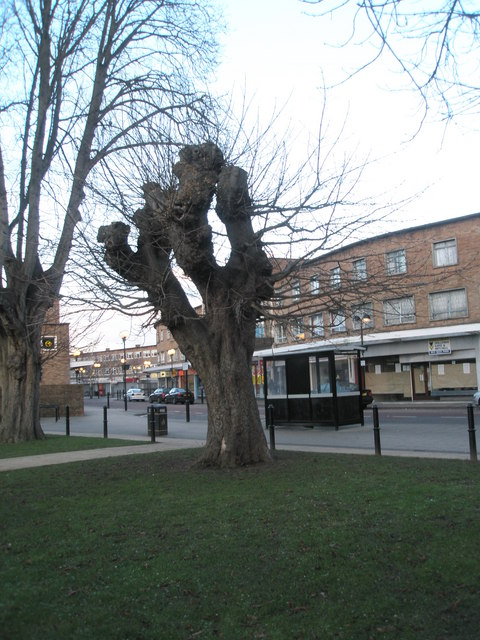
This large tree was topped, and many thin branches have begun to grow back.

Should a tree survive topping, tissue regrowth at the site of the original topping wound(s) is generally profuse. These new multiple leaders are less well-attached than was the original treetop, partly due to the effect of advancing decay at the wound site. As these weakly attached trunks increase in size, they become more prone to fall from the tree. Wind can increase this potential. Previously topped trees can present significant hazards and should be inspected by a qualified arborist, who can recommend possible solutions, such as removal, cabling, bracing, or ongoing inspection.

Aesthetic appeal is also compromised by topping, as the natural shapes of trees are lost.

== Alternatives ==
Alternatives based on scientific research are replacing tree topping. For example, size reduction can maintain the aesthetics and structural integrity of a tree without damage.

Spiral thinning and other forms of canopy thinning can decrease wind resistance and allow wind to pass through trees, reducing the potential for branch failure due to wind-throw. Thinning also allows more light penetration and air circulation, both important to tree health.

Other cultural practices include choosing plant material that will fit in the desired location at its mature size.

== Species indications ==
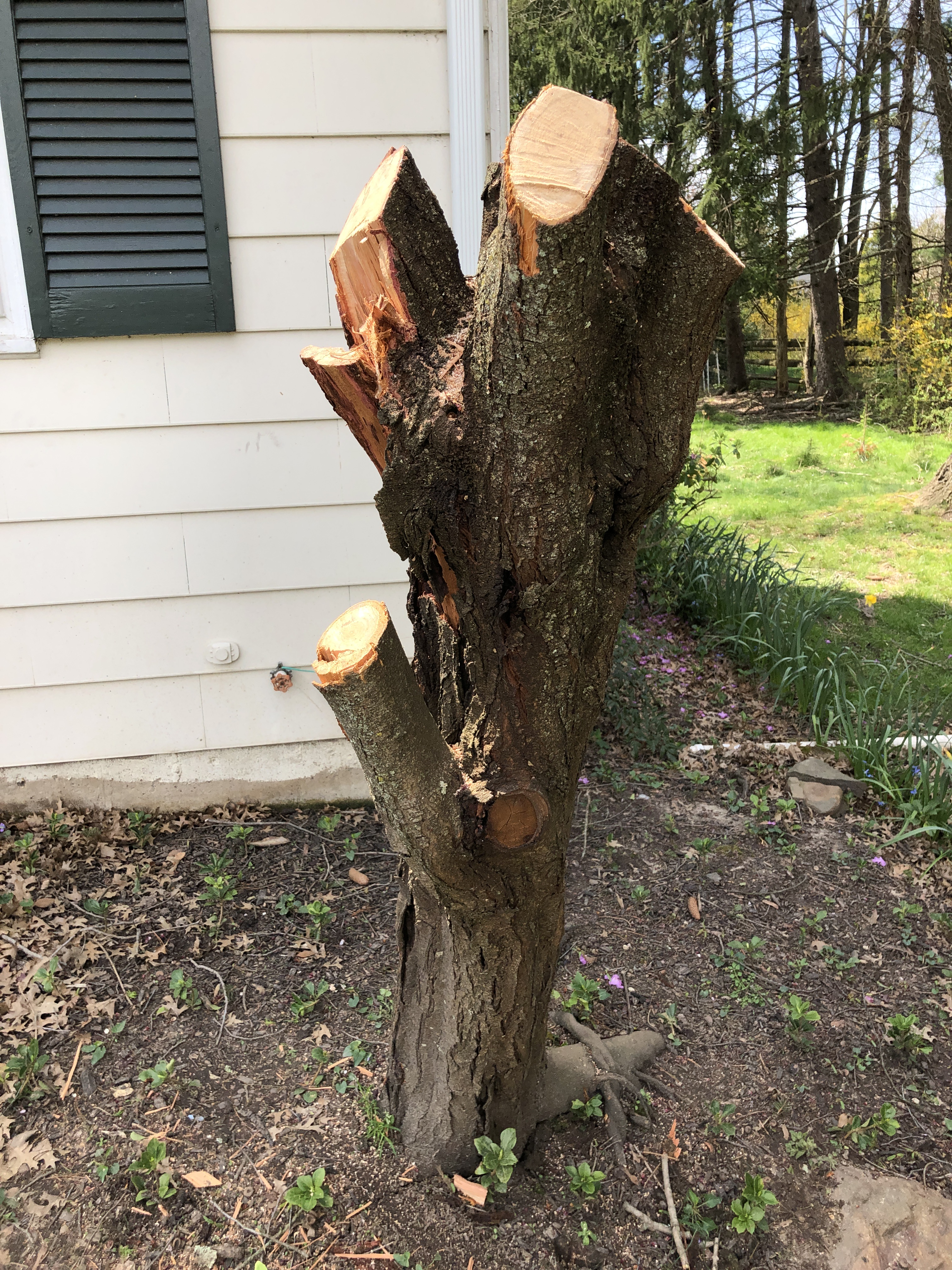
This purpleleaf plum tree was topped and severely pruned to promote growth. Plum trees usually benefit from an annual pruning cycle.

=== More effective compartmentalization of decay ===
- Ulmus parvifolia – Chinese elm

== See also ==
- Arboriculture
- Coppicing
- Pollarding
- Topping (agriculture)
