= Topping (agriculture) =

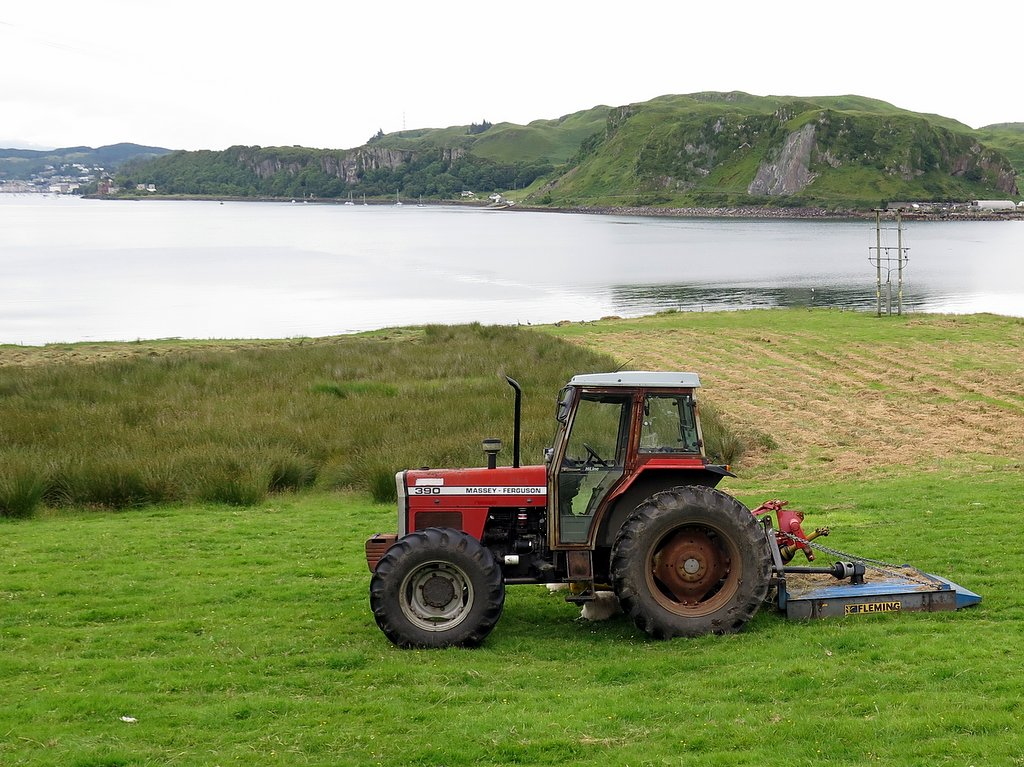
The tractor is pulling a topper to cut and mulch rushes near Ardchoirc

Topping is a process by which a mower or similar implement is used to "top", or remove, the aerial part of a crop, in order to prevent seed formation and distribution onto the soil. Typically, a set-aside cover crop is topped in July or August, to prevent seed production and subsequent soil contamination leading to germination and regrowth. For example, controlling the spread of Soft rush or Juncus Effusus on wet land, such as Purple Moor and Rush Pastures.

A variation of topping is often employed in order to create a more stout and bushy plant, one that is suitable for thriving indoors.

== See also ==
- Tree topping
