= Garden tool =

Tool made for gardening and landscaping

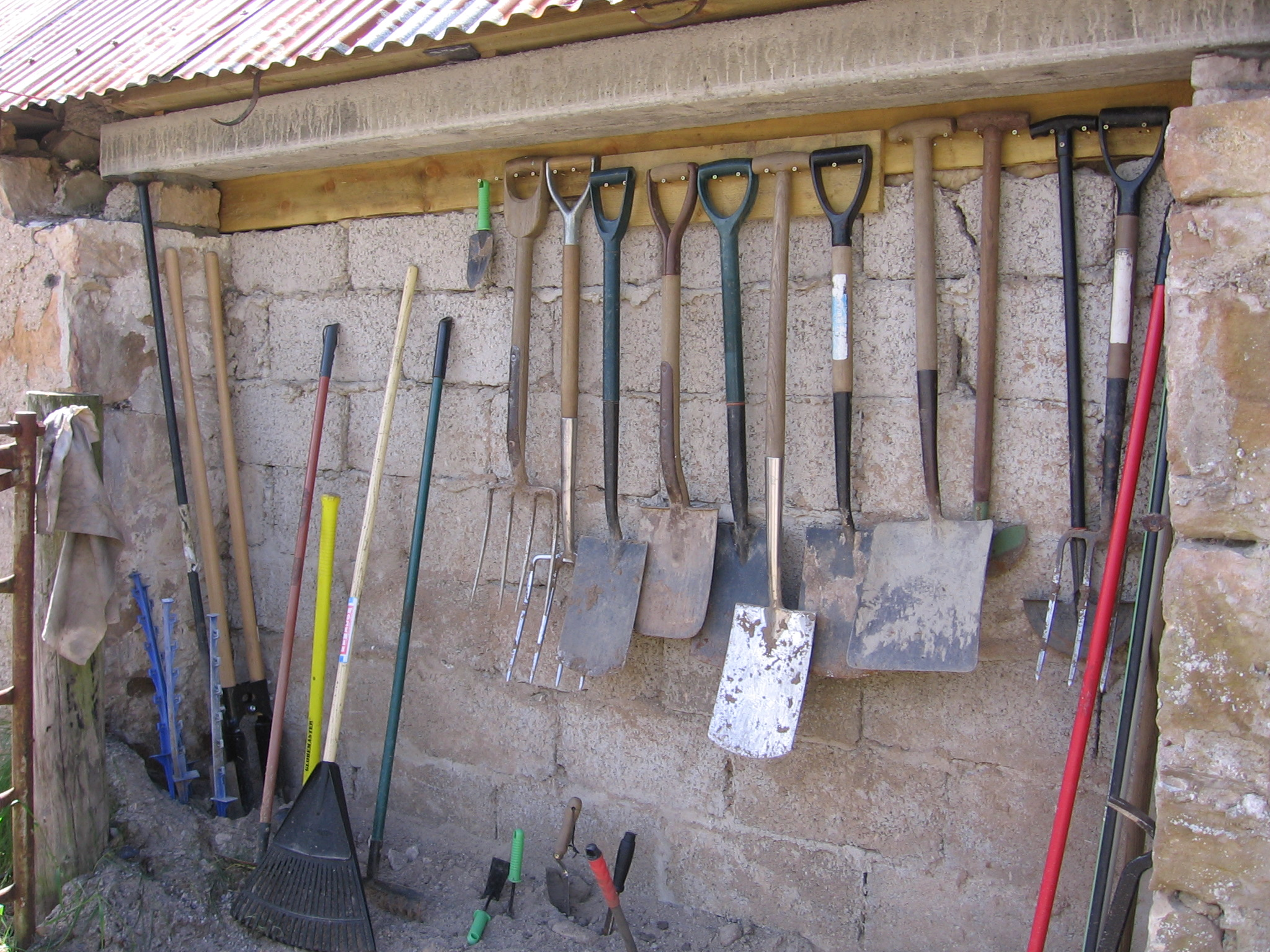
Garden tools, including various spades, garden forks, a leaf rake, and a garden trowel

A garden tool is any one of many tools made for gardening and landscaping, which overlap with the range of tools made for agriculture and horticulture. Garden tools can be divided into hand tools and power tools.

== Hand tools ==
Pruning tools that can be used to maintain a garden

Today's garden tools originated with the earliest agricultural implements used by humans. Examples include the hatchet, axe, sickle, scythe, pitchfork, spade, shovel, trowel, hoe, fork, and rake. In some places, the machete is common.

The earliest tools were made variously of wood, flint, metal, tin, and bone. The development of metalworking, first in copper and later in bronze, iron, and steel, produced today's durable tools, including such efficient cutting tools as pruning shears (secateurs – for example anvil pruners), grass shears, and loppers.

Increasing use of modern alloys allows many tools to be made both stronger and lighter, making them more durable and easier to use.

=== Ergonomics ===
Some modern tool designs reflect ergonomic considerations, being designed to induce less stress on the human body in use. The most efficient tools keep the body in a neutral position to help reduce the stress on joints and muscles, which also require less energy to use.

== Power tools ==
The first power tool to become popular with gardeners was the lawn mower. It was followed by various cultivators (such as the rototiller), string trimmers, hedge trimmers, lawn aerators, lawn sweepers, leaf blowers, chainsaws, mini-tractors, and others.

Power tools have resulted in the transition from manual labor to large-scale mechanised agriculture.

Gasoline power tools often come with disadvantages such as pollution, high running cost, high maintenance, and safety concerns. Due to this, modern power tools have shifted to battery-based electronic operation.

=== Environmental impact ===
The exhaust fumes from primarily 2-stroke gas-powered equipment is a source of air pollution. US emission standards specifically limit emissions from these small engines, which are being forced to become more efficient and less polluting. As Q1 2024 petrol powered tools are banned in California.

== See also ==
- Agricultural machinery
- Antique tool
- Groundskeeping § Equipment
- List of tools and equipment § Garden tools and equipment
