= Averruncator =

Type of extended shears for pruning distant branches

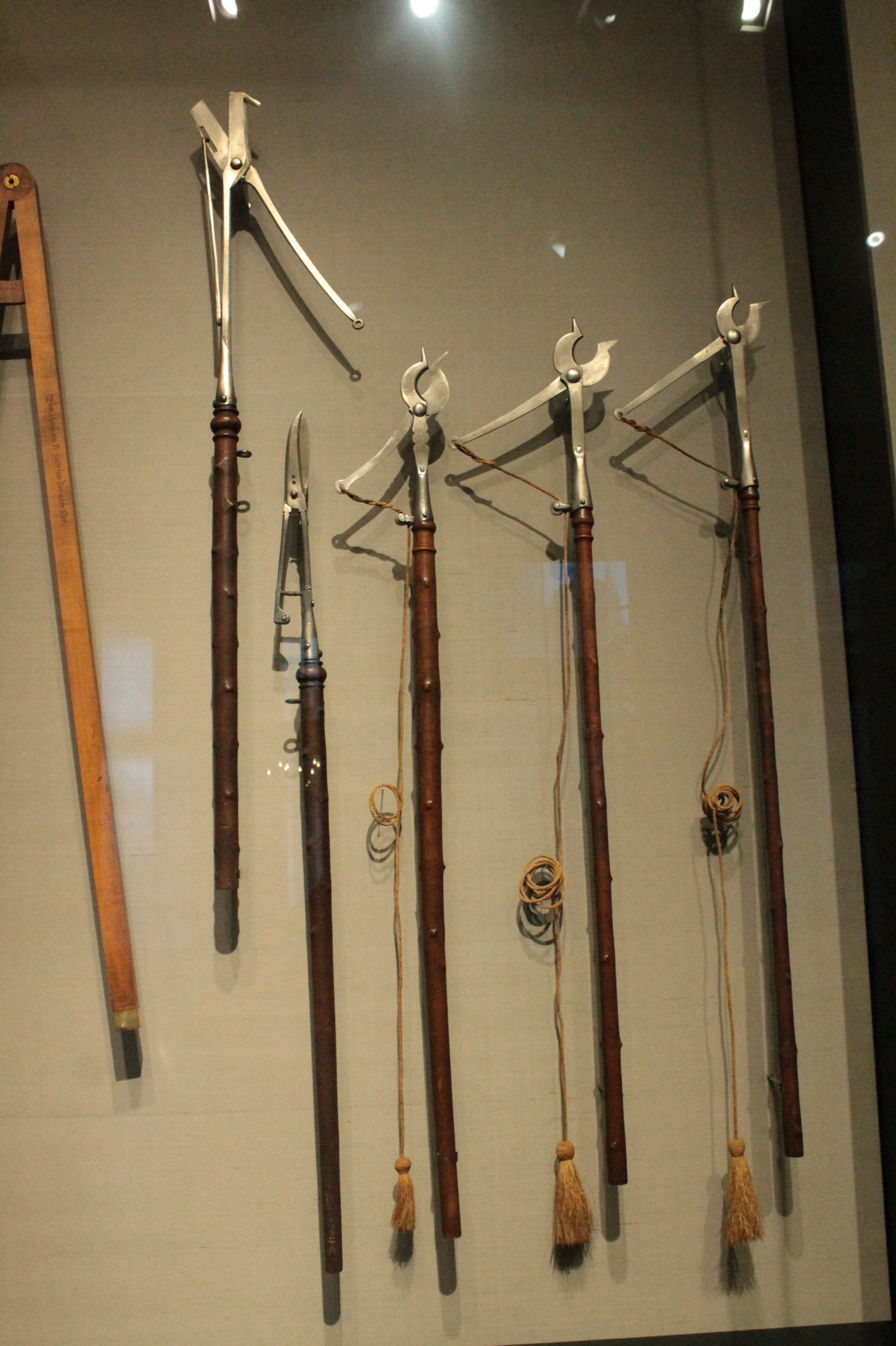
Selection of averruncators from 1560, Rustkammer museum, Dresden

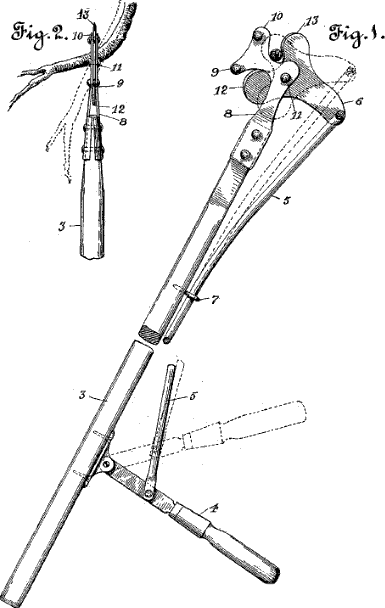
Fig.1 shows the handle and head of an averruncator. Fig. 2 shows the head in use.

An averruncator or pole pruner (American English) is a form of long shears used in arboriculture for averruncating or pruning off the higher branches of trees, etc.

== Etymology ==
The word averruncate (from Latin averruncare, "to ward off, remove mischief") glided into meaning to weed the ground, prune vines, etc., by a supposed derivation from the Lat. ab, "off", and eruncare, "to weed out", and it was spelt aberuncate to suit this; but the New English Dictionary regarded such a derivation as impossible.

== Description ==
An averruncator has a compound blade attached to a handle between five and eight feet long. The blades are closed with a rope and pulley, and they are opened with a spring.

== Types ==
There are at least three varieties of this tool, depending on how force is transmitted to the blades or the blade shape: shear-action, pully-action and parrot-bill.
