= Gardening =

Practice of growing and cultivating plants

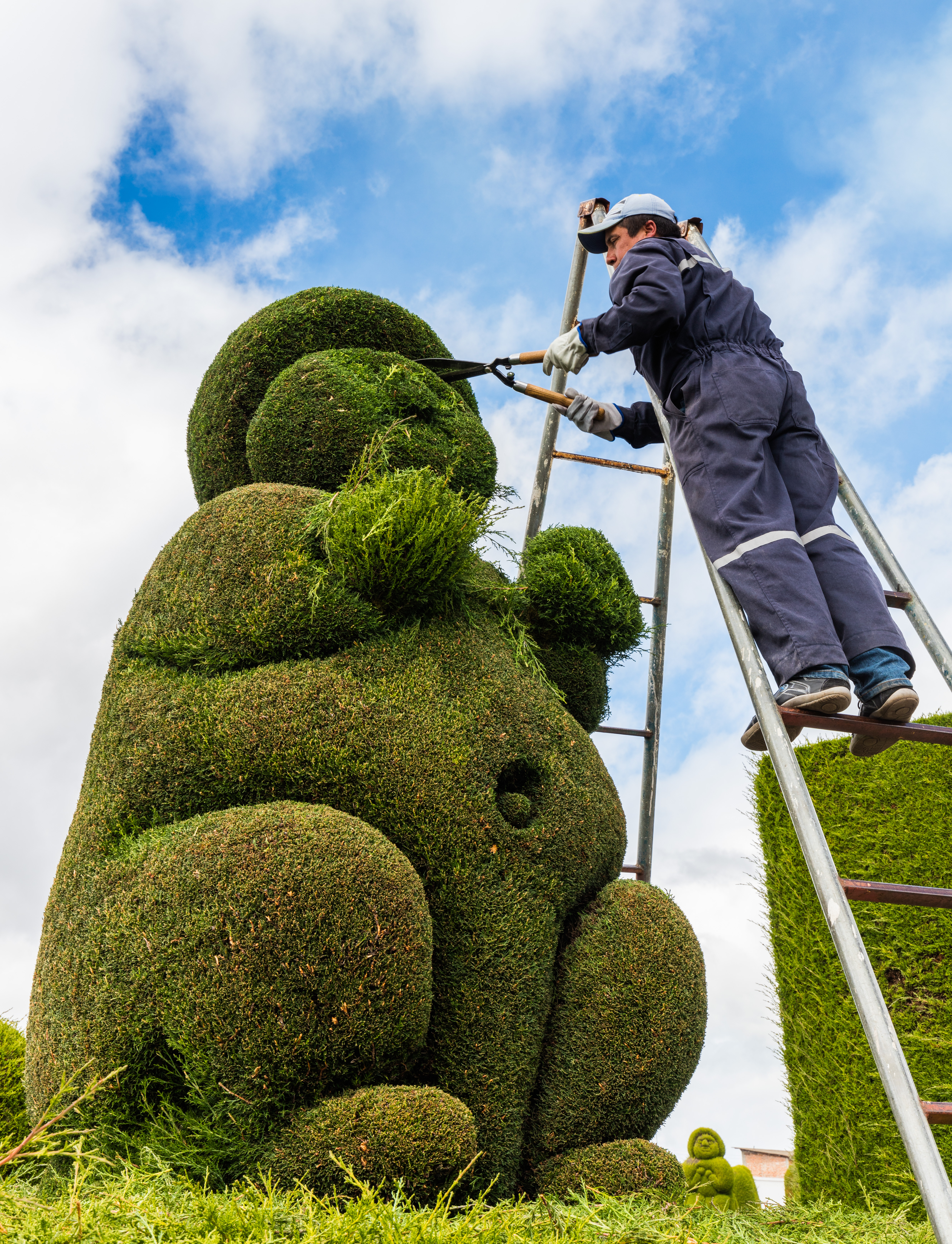
A gardener maintaining topiary in Tulcán, Ecuador

Gardening is the process of growing plants for their vegetables, fruits, flowers, herbs, or ornamental purposes within a designated space. Gardens fulfill a wide assortment of purposes, notably the production of aesthetically pleasing areas, medicines, cosmetics, dyes, foods, poisons, wildlife habitats, and saleable goods (see market gardening). People often partake in gardening for its therapeutic, health, educational, cultural, philosophical, environmental, and religious benefits.

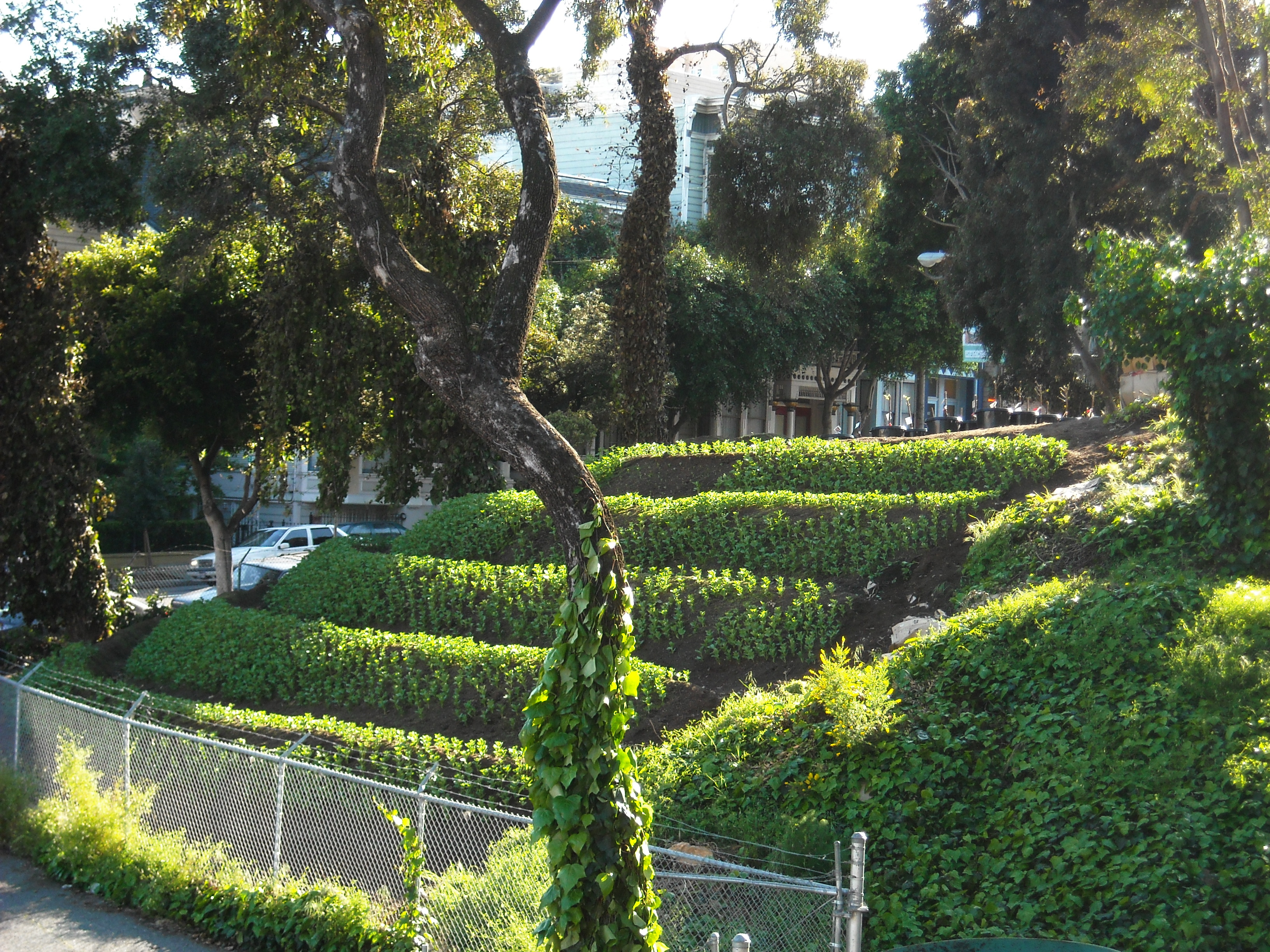
Berms of fava beans have been planted at Hayes Valley Farm, a community-built farm on the former Central freeway ramps of San Francisco

Gardening varies in scale from the 800 hectare Versailles gardens down to container gardens grown inside. Gardens take many forms; some only contain one type of plant, while others involve a complex assortment of plants, such as Botanical gardens, and complex designs, such as hedge mazes, while others take no particular plan, such as forest gardening. Gardening practices often respond to different cultural moments, for example, during World War II victory gardens were grown to advance the war effort, while more recently biodiversity focused gardening has developed in reaction to biodiversity loss, such as native plant gardening or like butterfly gardening.

Gardening can be difficult to differentiate from farming. They are most easily differentiated based on their primary objectives. Farming prioritizes saleable goods and may include livestock production, whereas gardening often prioritizes aesthetics and leisure. As it pertains to food production, gardening generally happens on a much smaller scale with the intent of personal or community consumption. There are cultures which do not differentiate between farming and gardening. This is primarily because subsistence agriculture has been the main method of farming throughout its 12,000 year history and is virtually indistinguishable from gardening.

== Prehistory ==
Plant domestication is seen as the birth of agriculture. However, it is arguably preceded by a very long history of gardening wild plants. While the 12,000-year-old date is the commonly accepted timeline describing plant domestication, there is now evidence from the Ohalo II hunter-gatherer site showing earlier signs of disturbing the soil and cultivation of pre-domesticated crop species. This evidence pushes early stage plant domestication to 23,000 years ago which aligns with research done by Allaby (2022) showing slight selection pressure of desirable traits in Southwest Asian cereals (einkorn, emmer, barley). Despite not qualifying as plant domestication, many archaeological studies are pushing the potential date of hominin selective ecosystem disturbance back up to 125,000 years ago. Much of these early recorded ecosystem disturbances were made through hominin use of fire, which dates back to 1.5 Mya (although at this time fire was not likely being wielded as a landscape-changing tool by hominids). This anthropogenic ecosystem disturbance may be the origin of gardening.

Every hunter-gatherer society has developed a niche of some sort, allowing them to thrive or even just survive amongst their environments. Many of these prehistoric hunter-gatherers had constructed a niche allowing for easier access to, or a higher amount of, edible plant species. This shift from hunting and gathering to increasingly modifying the environment in a way which produces an abundance of edible plant species marks the beginning of gardening. One of the most documented hominin niches is the use of off-site fire. When done intentionally, this is often called forest gardening or fire stick farming in Australia. The modern study of fire ecology describes the many benefits that off-site fires may have granted these early humans. Some of these agroecological practices have been well documented and studied during colonial contact. However, they are vastly under represented in research done on early hominin fire use. Based on current research, it is evident that these niches developed separately in different societies across different times and locations. Many of the Indigenous gardening methods were and still are often overlooked by colonizers due to the lack of resemblance to western gardens with well-defined borders and non-naturalized plant species.

=== The Americas ===
There are long traditions of gardening within Indigenous societies spanning from the northernmost parts of Canada down to the southernmost tip of Chile and Argentina. The Arctic and Subarctic societies relied primarily on hunting and fishing due to the harsh climate, although they have been known to collectively use at least 311 different plants as foods or medicines. The substantial knowledge and use of these plants along with the communal harvesting sites and emphasis on reciprocity between humans and plants indicates a basic level of gardening. Similarly, the Fuegian Indigenous groups in South America had developed seemingly comparable niches due to a similar tundra ecosystem. While there are very few studies on the Fuegians, Darwin mentioned wild edible plants such as fungi, kelp, and wild celery growing next to the various Fuegian shelters.

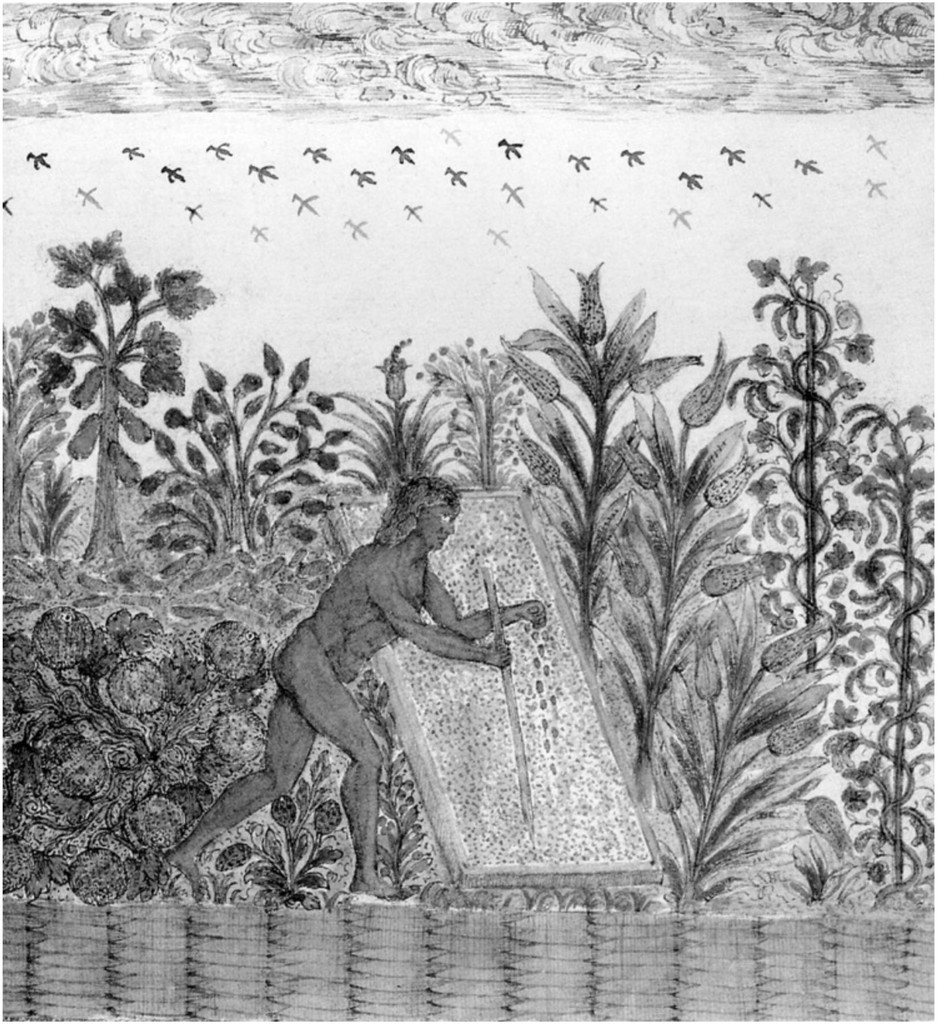
From the Drake manuscript, this is a drawing done by an anonymous Frenchman in the 16th century. It shows an Indigenous garden planted with papaya, pineapple, maize, beans, and cucurbits.

Horticulture plays a relatively small role in these northern and southern tundra inhabitants compared with Indigenous societies in grassland and forest ecosystems. From the boreal forests of Canada to the temperate forests and grasslands of Chile and Argentina, different communities have developed food production niches. These include the use of fire for ecosystem maintenance and resetting successional sequences, the sowing of wild annuals, the sowing of domesticated annuals (e.g. three sisters, New World crops), creating berry patches and orchards, manipulation of plants to encourage desired traits(e.g. increased nut, fruit, or root production), and landscape modification to encourage plant and animal growth (e.g. complex irrigation, sea gardens, or terraces). These modified landscapes as recorded by early American philosophers such as Thoreau, and Emmerson were described as exhibiting pristine beauty. Indigenous gardens such as forest gardens therefore do not only serve as a producer of foods, medicines, or materials, but also pleasant aesthetics.

Many popular crops originate from pre-colonial Indigenous agricultural societies. Some of these include maize, quinoa, common bean, peanut, pumpkin, squash, pepper, tomato, cassava, potato, blueberry, cactus pear, cashew, papaya, pineapple, strawberry, cacao, sunflower, cotton, Pará rubber, and tobacco.

== History ==
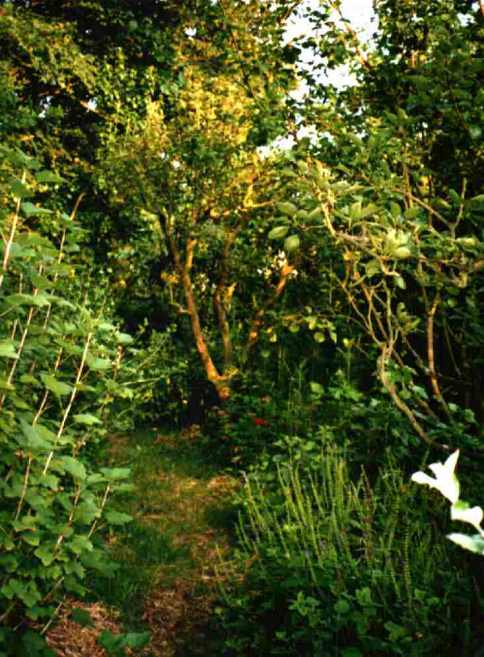
Robert Hart's forest garden in Shropshire, England

=== Ancient times ===
Forest gardening, a forest-based food production system, is the world's oldest form of gardening.

After the emergence of the first civilizations, wealthy individuals began to create gardens for aesthetic purposes. Ancient Egyptian tomb paintings from the New Kingdom (around 1500 BC) provide some of the earliest physical evidence of ornamental horticulture and landscape design; they depict lotus ponds surrounded by symmetrical rows of acacias and palms. A notable example of ancient ornamental gardens was the Hanging Gardens of Babylon—one of the Seven Wonders of the Ancient World —while ancient Rome had dozens of gardens.

Wealthy ancient Egyptians used gardens to provide shade. Egyptians associated trees and gardens with gods, believing that their deities were pleased by gardens. Gardens in ancient Egypt were often surrounded by walls with trees planted in rows. Among the most popular species planted were date palms, sycamores, fig trees, nut trees, and willows. These gardens were a sign of higher socioeconomic status. In addition, wealthy ancient Egyptians grew vineyards, as wine was a sign of the higher social classes. Roses, poppies, daisies and irises could all also be found in the gardens of the Egyptians.

Assyria was renowned for its beautiful gardens. These tended to be wide and large, some of them used for hunting game, rather like a game reserve today, and others as leisure gardens. Cypresses and palms were some of the most frequently planted types of trees.

Gardens were also available in Kush. In Musawwarat es-Sufra, the Great Enclosure, dated to the 3rd century BC, included splendid gardens.

Ancient Roman gardens were laid out with hedges and vines and contained a wide variety of flowers—acanthus, cornflowers, crocus, cyclamen, hyacinth, iris, ivy, lavender, lilies, myrtle, narcissus, poppy, rosemary and violets—as well as statues and sculptures. Flower beds were popular in the courtyards of rich Romans.

=== The Middle Ages ===
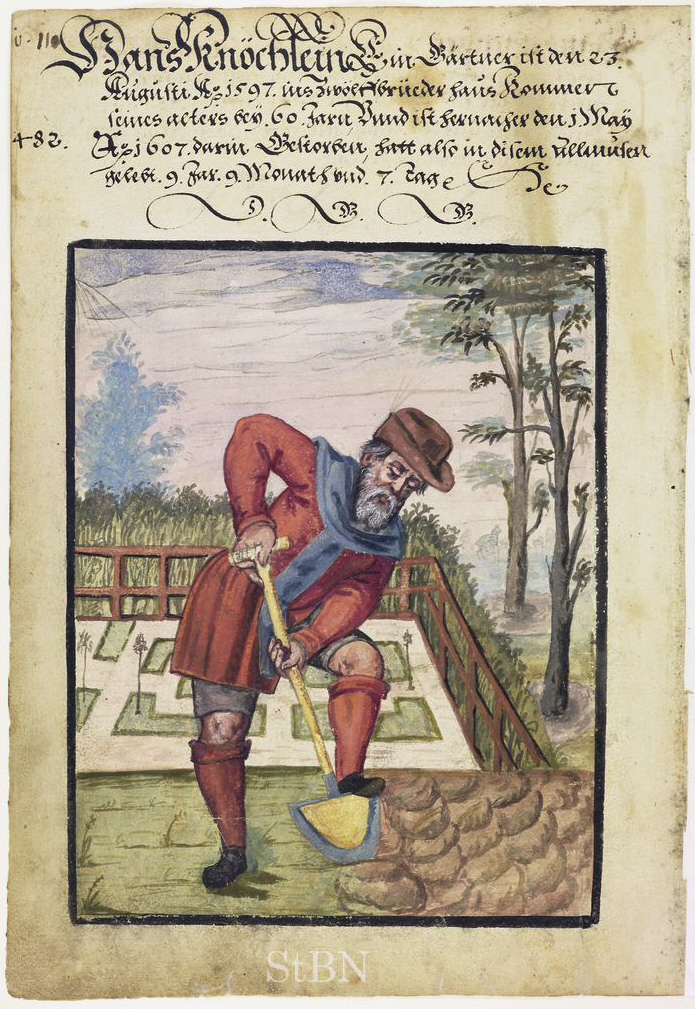
A gardener at work, 1607

The Middle Ages represent a period of decline in gardens for aesthetic purposes. After the fall of Rome, gardening was done for the purpose of growing medicinal herbs and/or decorating church altars. Monasteries carried on a tradition of garden design and intense horticultural techniques during the medieval period in Europe. Generally, monastic garden types consisted of kitchen gardens, infirmary gardens, cemetery orchards, cloister garths and vineyards. Individual monasteries might also have had a "green court", a plot of grass and trees where horses could graze, as well as a cellarer's garden or private gardens for obedientiaries, monks who held specific posts within the monastery.

Islamic gardens were built after the model of Persian gardens, and they were usually enclosed by walls and divided into four by watercourses. Commonly, the centre of the garden would have a reflecting pool or pavilion. Specific to the Islamic gardens are the mosaics and glazed tiles used to decorate the rills and fountains that were built in these gardens.

By the late 13th century, rich Europeans began to grow gardens for leisure and medicinal herbs and vegetables. They surrounded the gardens by walls to protect them from animals and to provide seclusion. During the next two centuries, Europeans started planting lawns and raising flowerbeds and trellises of roses. Fruit trees were common in these gardens, and also in some, there were turf seats. At the same time, the gardens in the monasteries were a place to grow flowers and medicinal herbs, but they were also a space where the monks could enjoy nature and relax.

The gardens in the 16th and 17th centuries were symmetric, proportioned and balanced with a more classical appearance. Most of these gardens were built around a central axis, and they were divided into different parts by hedges. Commonly, gardens had flowerbeds laid out in squares and separated by gravel paths.

Gardens during the Renaissance were adorned with sculptures, topiary and fountains. In the 17th century, knot gardens became popular along with the hedge mazes. By this time, Europeans started planting new flowers such as tulips, marigolds and sunflowers.

=== Cottage gardens ===
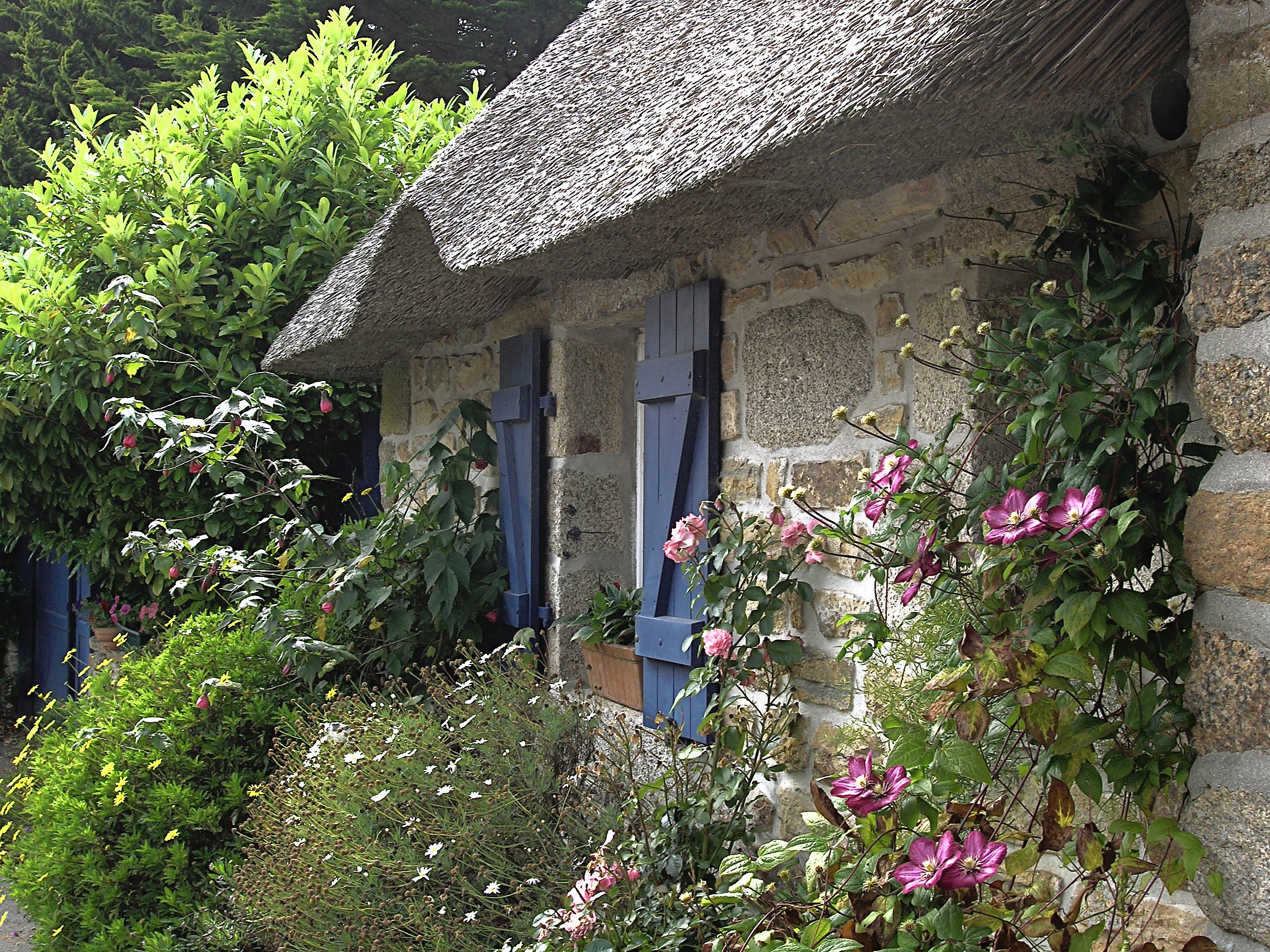
A cottage garden in Brittany

Cottage gardens, which emerged in Elizabethan times, appear to have originated as a local source for herbs and fruits. One theory is that they arose out of the Black Death of the 1340s, when the death of so many laborers made land available for small cottages with personal gardens. According to the late 19th-century legend of origin, These gardens were originally created by the workers who lived in the cottages of the villages to provide them with food and herbs, with flowers planted among them for decoration. Farm workers were provided with cottages that had architectural quality set in a small garden—about 1 acre (0.40 hectares)—where they could grow food and keep pigs and chickens.

Authentic gardens of the yeoman cottager would have included a beehive and livestock, and frequently a pig and sty, along with a well. The peasant cottager of medieval times was more interested in meat than flowers, with herbs grown for medicinal use rather than for their beauty. By Elizabethan times, there was more prosperity, and thus more room to grow flowers. Even the early cottage garden flowers typically had their practical use—violets were spread on the floor (for their pleasant scent and keeping out vermin); calendulas and primroses were both attractive and used in cooking. Others, such as sweet William and hollyhocks, were grown entirely for their beauty.

=== 18th century ===
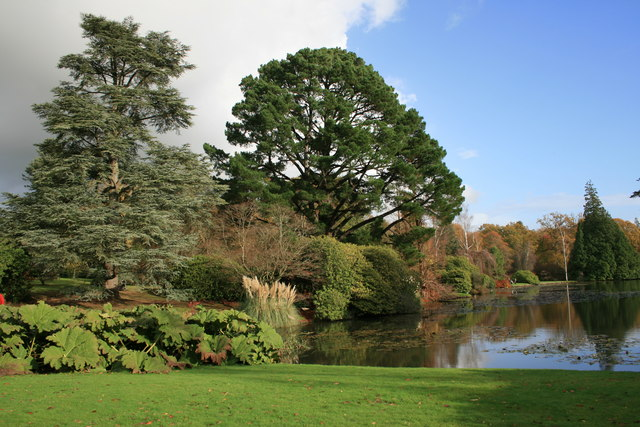
Sheffield Park Garden, a landscape garden originally laid out in the 18th century by Capability Brown

In the 18th century, gardens were laid out more naturally, without any walls. This style of smooth, undulating grass, which would run straight to the house, clumps, belts and scattering of trees and serpentine lakes formed by invisibly damming small rivers, was a new style within the English landscape. This was a "gardenless" form of landscape gardening, which swept away almost all the remnants of previous, formally patterned styles. The English landscape garden usually included a lake, lawns set against groves of trees, and often contained shrubberies, grottoes, pavilions, bridges and follies such as mock temples, Gothic ruins, bridges, and other picturesque architecture, designed to recreate an idyllic pastoral landscape. This new style emerged in England in the early 18th century, and spread across Europe, replacing the more formal, symmetrical garden à la française of the 17th century as the principal gardening style of Europe. The English garden presented an idealized view of nature. They were often inspired by paintings of landscapes by Claude Lorrain and Nicolas Poussin, and some were Influenced by the classic Chinese gardens of the East, which had recently been described by European travelers. The work of Lancelot 'Capability' Brown was particularly influential. Also, in 1804, the Horticultural Society was formed.

Gardens of the 19th century contained plants such as the monkey puzzle or Chile pine. This is also the time when the so-called "gardenesque" style of gardens evolved. These gardens displayed a wide variety of flowers in a rather small space. Rock gardens increased in popularity in the 19th century.

In ancient India, patterns from sacred geometry and mandalas were used to design gardens. Distinct mandala patterns denoted specific deities, planets, or even constellations. Such a garden was also referred to as a 'Mandala Vaatika'. The word 'Vaatika' can mean garden, plantation or parterre.

== Types ==
Residential gardening takes place near the home, in a space referred to as the garden. Although a garden typically is located on the land near a residence, it may also be located on a roof, in an atrium, on a balcony, in a window box, on a patio or vivarium.

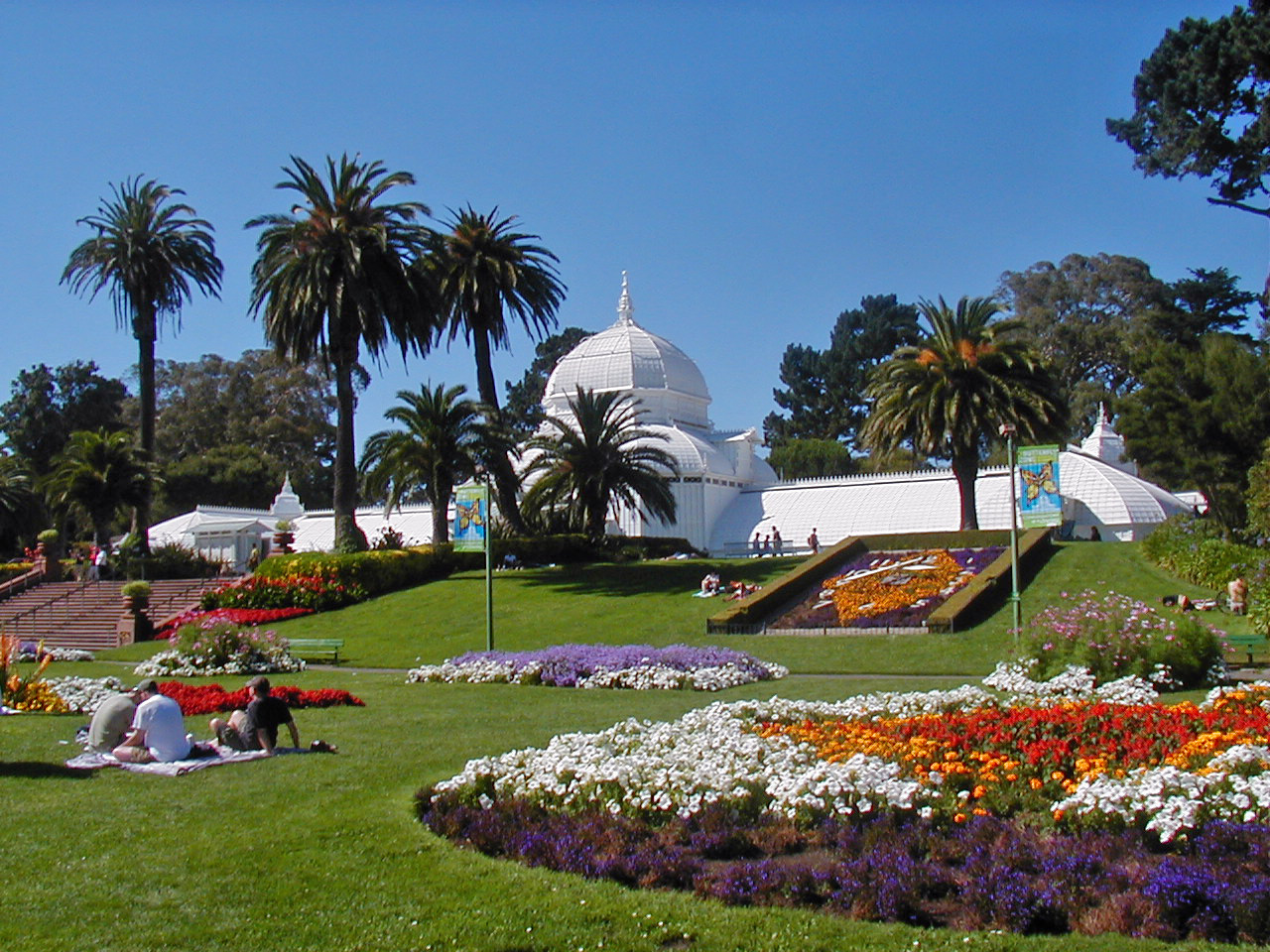
Conservatory of Flowers in Golden Gate Park, San Francisco

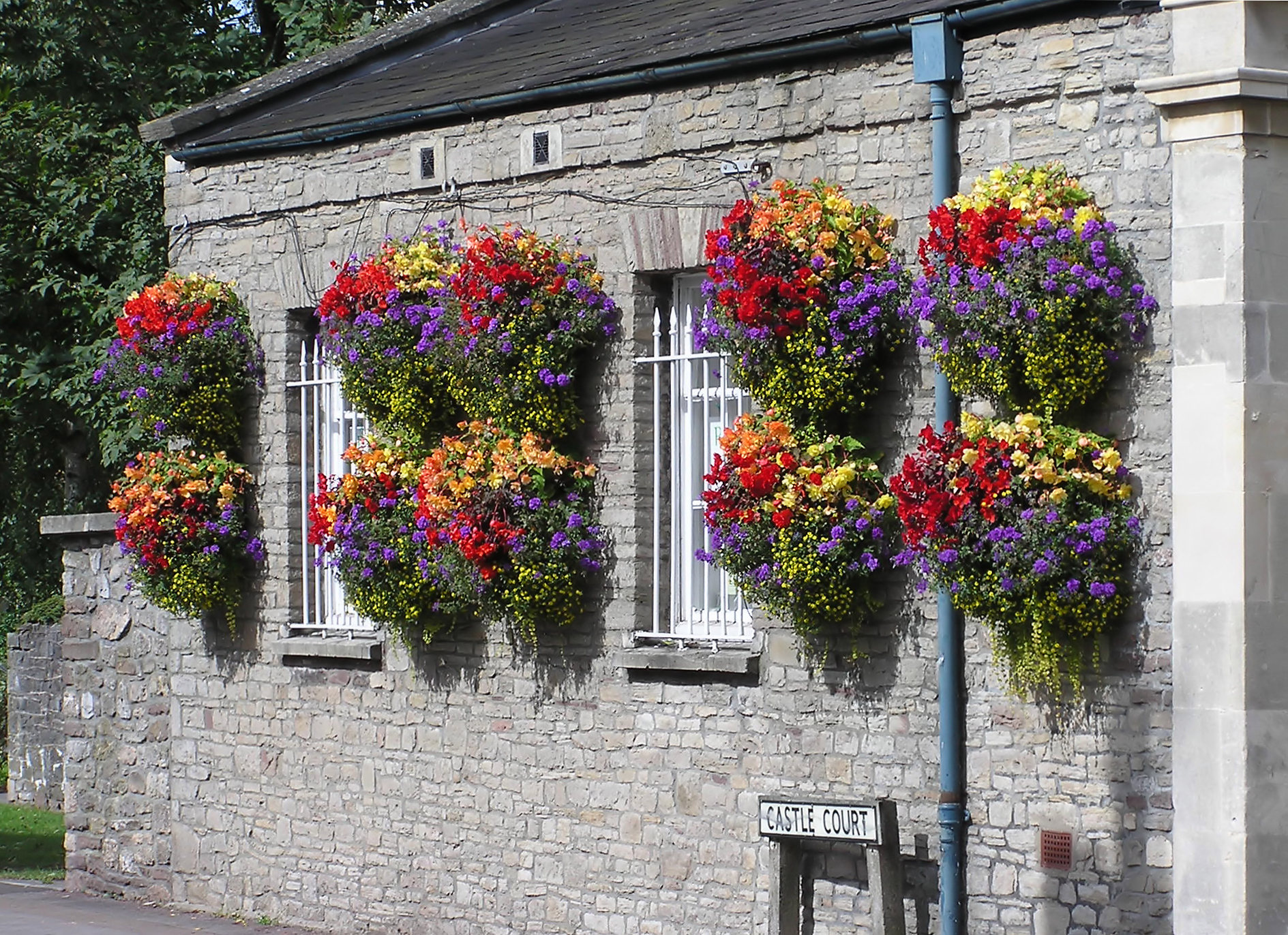
Hanging baskets in Thornbury, South Gloucestershire

Gardening also takes place in non-residential green areas, such as parks, public or semi-public gardens (botanical gardens or zoological gardens), amusement parks, along transportation corridors, and around tourist attractions and garden hotels. In these situations, a staff of gardeners or groundskeepers maintains the gardens.

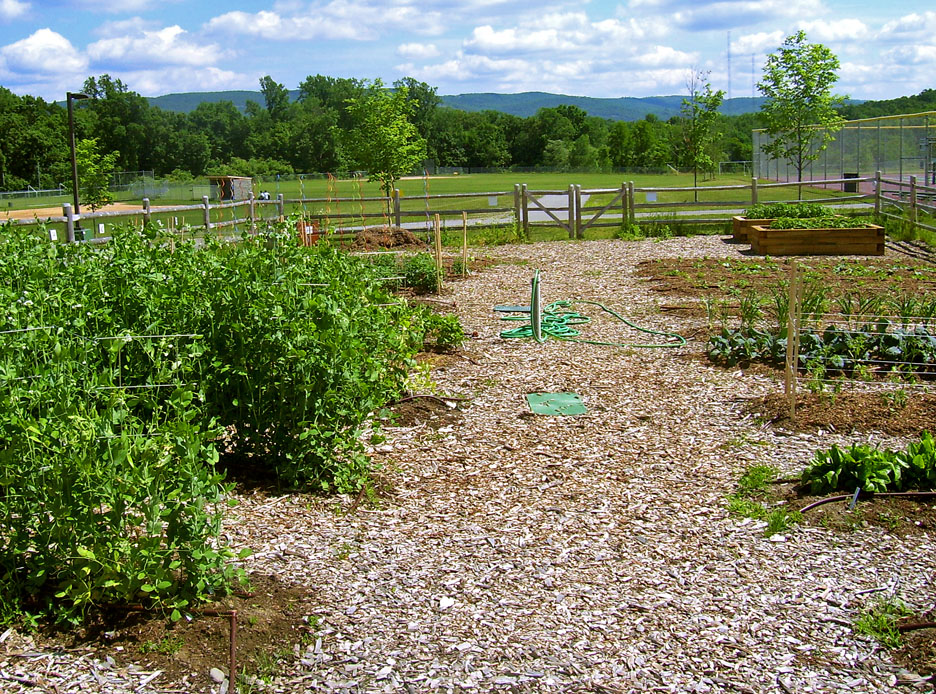
An organic garden on a school campus

- Indoor gardening is concerned with the growing of houseplants within a residence or building, in a conservatory, or in a greenhouse. Indoor gardens are sometimes incorporated as part of air conditioning or heating systems. Indoor gardening extends the growing season in the fall and spring and can be used for winter gardening.
- Native plant gardening is concerned with the use of native plants with or without the intent of creating wildlife habitat. The goal is to create a garden in harmony with, and adapted to a given area. This type of gardening typically reduces water usage, maintenance, and fertilization costs, while increasing native faunal interest.
- Water gardening is concerned with growing plants adapted to pools and ponds. Bog gardens are also considered a type of water garden. These all require special conditions and considerations. A simple water garden may consist solely of a tub containing the water and plant(s). In aquascaping, a garden is created within an aquarium tank.
- Container gardening is concerned with growing plants in any type of container, either indoors or outdoors. Common containers are pots, hanging baskets, and planters. Container gardening is usually used in atriums and on balconies, patios, and rooftops.
- Hügelkultur is concerned with growing plants on piles of rotting wood, as a form of raised bed gardening and composting in situ. An English loanword from German, it means "mound garden". Toby Hemenway, noted permaculture author and teacher, considers wood buried in trenches to also be a form of hugelkultur referred to as a dead wood swale. Hugelkultur is practiced by Sepp Holzer as a method of forest gardening and agroforestry, and by Geoff Lawton as a method of dryland farming and desert greening. When used as a method of disposing of large volumes of waste wood and woody debris, hugelkultur accomplishes carbon sequestration. It is also a form of xeriscaping.
- Community gardening is a social activity in which an area of land is gardened by a group of people, providing access to fresh produce, herbs, flowers and plants as well as access to satisfying labor, neighborhood improvement, sense of community and connection to the environment. Community gardens are typically owned in trust by local governments or nonprofits.
- Garden sharing partners landowners with gardeners in need of land. These shared gardens, typically front or back yards, are usually used to produce food that is divided between the two parties.
- Organic gardening uses natural, sustainable methods, fertilizers and pesticides to grow non-genetically modified crops.
- Biodynamic gardening or biodynamic agriculture is similar to organic gardening, but includes various esoteric concepts drawn from the ideas of Rudolf Steiner, such as astrological sowing and planting calendar and particular field and compost preparations.
- Commercial gardening is a more intensive type of gardening that involves the production of vegetables, non-tropical fruits, and flowers by local farmers. Commercial gardening began because farmers would sell locally to stop food from spoiling faster due to the transportation of goods from a far distance. Mediterranean agriculture is also a common practice that commercial gardeners use. Mediterranean agriculture is the practice of cultivating animals such as sheep to help weed and provide manure for vine crops, grains, or citrus. Gardeners can easily train these animals not to eat the actual plant.
- No-dig gardening (or no-till gardening) is a method of gardening that avoids tillage as much as possible. This method of gardening is gaining popularity in part due to celebrated figures such as Charles Dowding, Masanobu Fukuoka, Jean-Martin Fortier, Connor Crickmore, Jesse Frost, Elaine Ingham, and many other market gardeners. Minimal tillage has been documented to help with promoting diverse soil biology, water retention and drainage, healthier vigorous plants, reduction in weed pressure, reduction in labor, increased fertility and nutrient availability, increase carbon sequestration, reduction in cost, reduction in soil erosion, and reduction in pollution.

== Tools ==
Regardless of historical time period, location, scale, or type of garden, all gardening requires some basic tools. For the majority of human history, people have managed with significantly fewer resources compared to modern times. Agriculture was built on the use of hands, stones, sticks, human ingenuity, and fire. The essential tools used in pre-Bronze Age gardening were non-metal (primarily stone, bone, wood, or copper) knives, axes, adzes, foot ploughs, sickles, hoes, baskets, pottery, digging sticks, animal-driven ploughs, animals, and fire for clearing land. Up until the green revolution, these simple tools, although continually improved upon, would continue to be the backbone of agricultural societies.

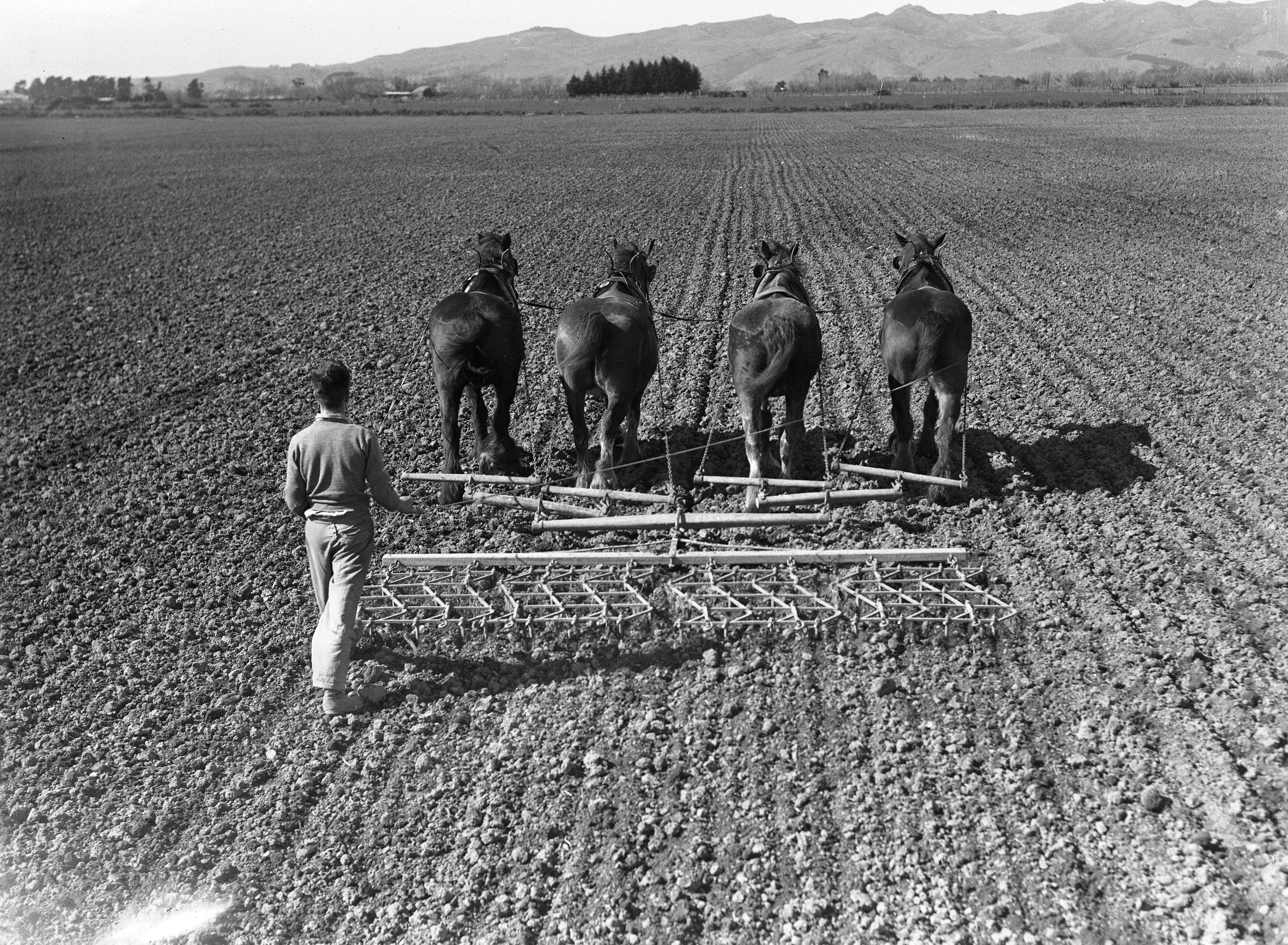
Harrowing a field on the Canterbury Agricultural College farm in 1948.

The industrial revolution created a large increase in the availability and impact of agricultural tools. These tools include tractors with modern implements, manure spreaders, cultivators, mowers, earth-moving machines, hedge trimmers, strimmer's, wood-chippers, two-wheel tractors, complex irrigation systems, plastic mulch, plastic shelters, seeding trays, indoor grow lights, packaging, chemical fertilizers, pesticides, genetically modified seeds, and many more.

== Vegetable gardening ==
Vegetable gardening typically emphasizes small-scale, low-cost methods that help new gardeners develop basic skills before expanding. Most introductory approaches recommend starting with a limited garden area, often around 3 metres (10 ft) long and wide, to make planting, watering, and maintenance manageable. Location is considered essential; most commonly grown vegetables require 6–8 hours of sunlight per day, while leafy greens can tolerate partial shade.

Many beginner guides encourage choosing easy, fast-growing crops such as lettuce, radishes, green beans, zucchini, tomatoes, and garlic. These vegetables generally adapt well to a wide range of climates and soil conditions, making them suitable for new gardeners. Soil preparation is a major focus, with loose, well-draining soil enriched with compost or organic matter considered key to successful harvests.

Planting methods vary: some vegetables are direct-sown (planted as seeds straight into the garden soil), while others, such as tomatoes and peppers, are commonly started as seedlings. Consistent watering, preferably in the morning, and the use of mulch to conserve moisture are widely recommended practices. New gardeners are also encouraged to monitor soil moisture levels rather than relying on a fixed schedule.

Common beginner-friendly cultivation systems include in-ground beds, raised beds, and container gardening. Raised beds are often highlighted for their improved drainage and simplified soil management, especially in urban or small-space settings. Early pest management strategies typically emphasize non-chemical options such as hand-removal of insects, row covers, and companion planting.

Frequent challenges for new vegetable gardeners include overwatering, overcrowding, and insufficient soil preparation. Many educational sources recommend keeping seasonal notes to help gardeners learn how local climate, sunlight, and soil behavior affect plant growth over time.

== Plant propagation ==
Plants may be propagated through many different methods. These methods are classified as either sexual or asexual propagation.

=== Asexual reproduction ===
Asexual reproduction occurs when plants produce clonal offspring. This method of reproduction is often more simplistic and provides rapid population growth. Cloning may result in highly vulnerable plant populations if they do not also reproduce sexually in order to create genetic diversity, thus allowing for certain levels of natural selection and hybrid vigor. There are various methods of asexual plant propagation taken advantage of by gardeners. These include vegetative propagation, which involves the growth of new plants from vegetative parts of the parent plant, such as roots, stems, and leaves. Certain plants such as strawberries and raspberries produce stolons or rhizomes which are stems which grow horizontally above or below ground, developing new plants at nodes. Another common method of asexual reproduction in garden plants is fragmentation which involves a separation from the parent plant. This is common for shrubs, and trees such as willows which may shed their branches which is termed cladoptosis. Placing the shed limb into water or soil produces budding and causes roots to form.

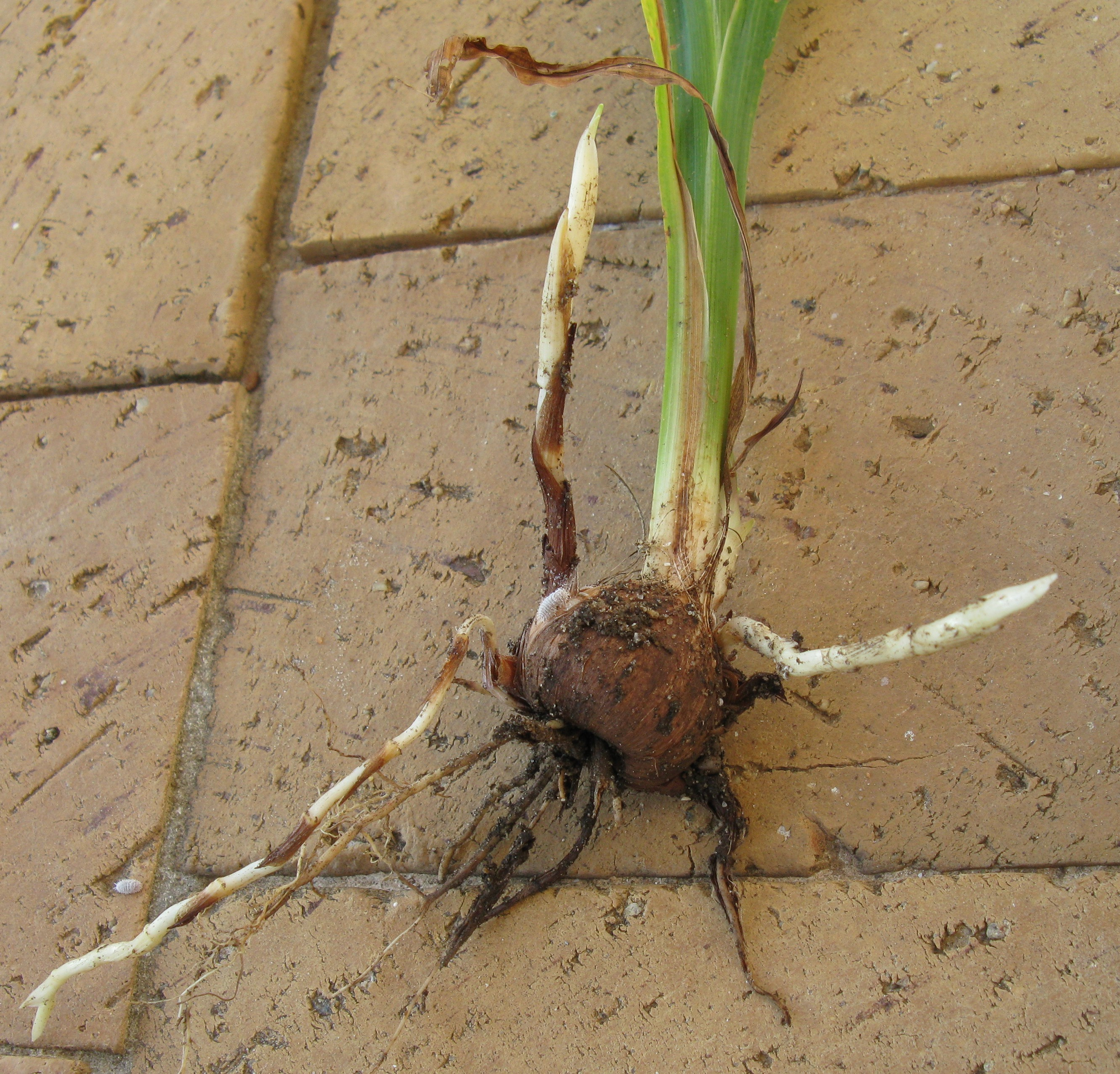
Stolons growing from nodes from a corm of Crocosmia

Perhaps the most commonly known method of asexual reproduction in gardening and farming is grafting. A human may choose to graft an excellent fruit-producing cultivar on a selected rootstock cultivar of the same species. This involves cutting each plant and connecting the cuttings by mechanical means until they inosculate or fuse together. Grafting is done for many purposes. Firstly, the scion (portion of the plant above the graft site) can undergo artificial selection for specific desirable traits such as flavor while the rootstock can undergo selection for traits such as disease resistance or cold tolerance. This effectively allows for much more efficiency in the artificial selection process as certain traits such as fruit taste can be ignored altogether in the rootstock allowing for a focused selection with less backcrossing to a plant that had good tasting fruit. Secondly, grafting allows for plants that require cross-pollination for fruit generation, such as apples, to all grow together as one tree. Thirdly, this allows for quick reproduction where one mother plant can produce many semi-developed clones each year.

=== Sexual reproduction ===
Sexual reproduction occurs through the pollination of an ovule. This pollination must occur between the female and male parts of a single flower or between flowers. A plant may undergo self-pollination as a sexual means of reproduction, where the genes of the mother plant will not perfectly match those of the progeny. Progeny from self-pollination will, however, have less genetic diversity which may result in inbreeding depression versus plants from cross-pollination. Pollen is typically carried by wind, insects, or animals to complete pollination. Some greenhouses may have to manually pollinate their plants to produce fruit and seeds due to a lack of these conditions. Sexual reproduction can only be done by members of the same species and this produces varying levels of genetic diversity in the plants' offspring. This genetic diversity is responsible for the survival of every plant as we know it today. The diversity allows for disease resistance, adaptations to changing climate, changes in soil, changes in pollination methods, changes in animal grazing pressure, changes in weed pressure, and any other variations that arise in their growing conditions. Crossing plants, or hybridizing, results in hybrid vigor and increases the genetic diversity.

Time course imaging of two maize inbreds (LH198 and PHG47) and the F1 hybrid (LH198/PHG47) generated by crossing the two together

Many commercially grown plants are F1 hybrids, which ensures certain desirable traits. A common alternative to growing hybrid plants is to grow heirloom or open-pollinated plants, which, unlike F1 hybrids, will produce viable seed with progeny similar to its parent. Many modern gardeners will save seeds from heirloom varieties but not hybrids due to the certainty of desirable traits heirloom seeds provide. Historically, a lack of plant breeding knowledge would have led to more hybridization and the creation of new genetically diverse landraces. Each plant varies in its likelihood of outcrossing. Highly outcrossing plants such as spinach are more likely to create landraces. Many landraces and heirloom varieties along with their genetics are being lost due to the decrease in seed saving by modern farmers. This leads plant geneticists to search for desirable genetics in wild ancestral varieties of commonly grown plants. Plants have been artificially selected and bred since at least 7800 BCE. Despite the decrease in farmer seed saving, many landraces are also being created through artificial selection and genetic modification. Gardeners remain vital in the preservation of diverse genetics whether they maintain a family heirloom variety bred to fit conditions from the distant past, or they breed new landraces with traits matching their modern climate and growing condition.

Certain seeds may not sprout without certain environmental conditions. These seeds either require scarification or stratification. Gardeners may grow frustrated if they lack this crucial knowledge before attempting to propagate certain plants such as hard neck garlic (asexual reproduction), which requires a cold dormant period to sprout, or saskatoon berries which have improved germination after being digested by bears through a process called endozoochory.

=== Transplanting ===
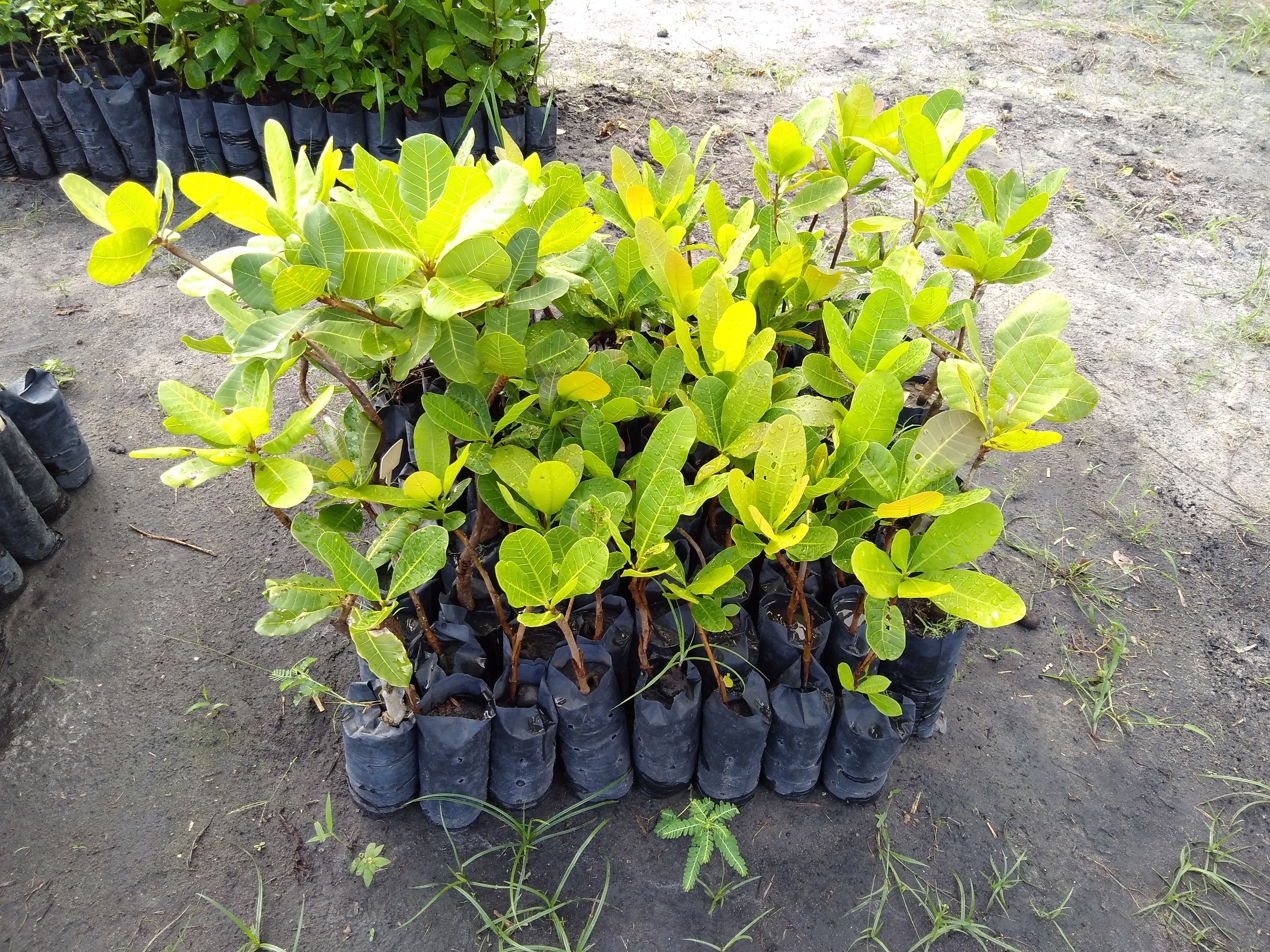
Cashew (Anacardium occidentale) grafted seedlings ready for transplanting in Ceará, Brazil

Many gardeners, especially those who live in colder climates, will start seeds indoors prior to transplanting the young plants outside. This provides many benefits such as elongating the growing season, ensuring adequate quantities and quality of light, ensuring seedlings have adequate nutrients in the seed starting mix, ensuring seeds stay at correct humidity, heat, and moisture level for germination, and saving space in the garden. Many crops will not be harvestable unless they are started inside so if a gardener wants to plant these crops in their garden without starting the plants themselves, they will need to purchase transplants which are commonly available at garden centers, plant nurseries, and big-box stores. It is crucial that transplanting is done correctly. This generally implies providing the plants with enough soil so they do not become root-bound (roots wrapping in circles around transplant container), providing a hardening-off period (slow exposure to sun, wind, and cold), providing sufficient light, water, and nutrients, and choosing the correct plants to start indoors as some plants do not do well with the transplanting process.

There are varying methods of starting your seeds. The most prevalent method would be to start seeds in transplant (plug) trays or in planters/pots. Another method is starting seeds in soil blocks (small cubes of compressed potting soil, compost, and/or other seed-starting media), which may reduce transplant shock and stop root-binding because they allow air pruning of the roots. Some plants such as onions and various herbs may be efficiently started by scattering their seeds on top of soil in a large tray where the seedlings will later be teased apart from each other and replanted in the garden or pots.

== Pests ==
Garden pests are generally plants, fungi, or animals (frequently insects) that engage in activity that the gardener considers undesirable. A pest may crowd out desirable plants, disturb soil, stunt the growth of young seedlings, steal or damage fruit, or otherwise kill plants, hamper their growth, damage their appearance, or reduce the quality of the edible or ornamental portions of the plant. Aphids, spider mites, slugs, snails, ants, birds, and even cats are commonly considered to be garden pests.

Throughout history, ecosystems that have undergone rapid changes are typically those that harbor the most pests. For example, a highly and rapidly altered landscape such as modern canola fields in the Americas can be a breeding ground for pests of the Brassicaceae family. A natural ecosystem will typically regulate pest levels through many biological means whether that be the natural introduction of a disease or an increase in the population of a predator species of animal.

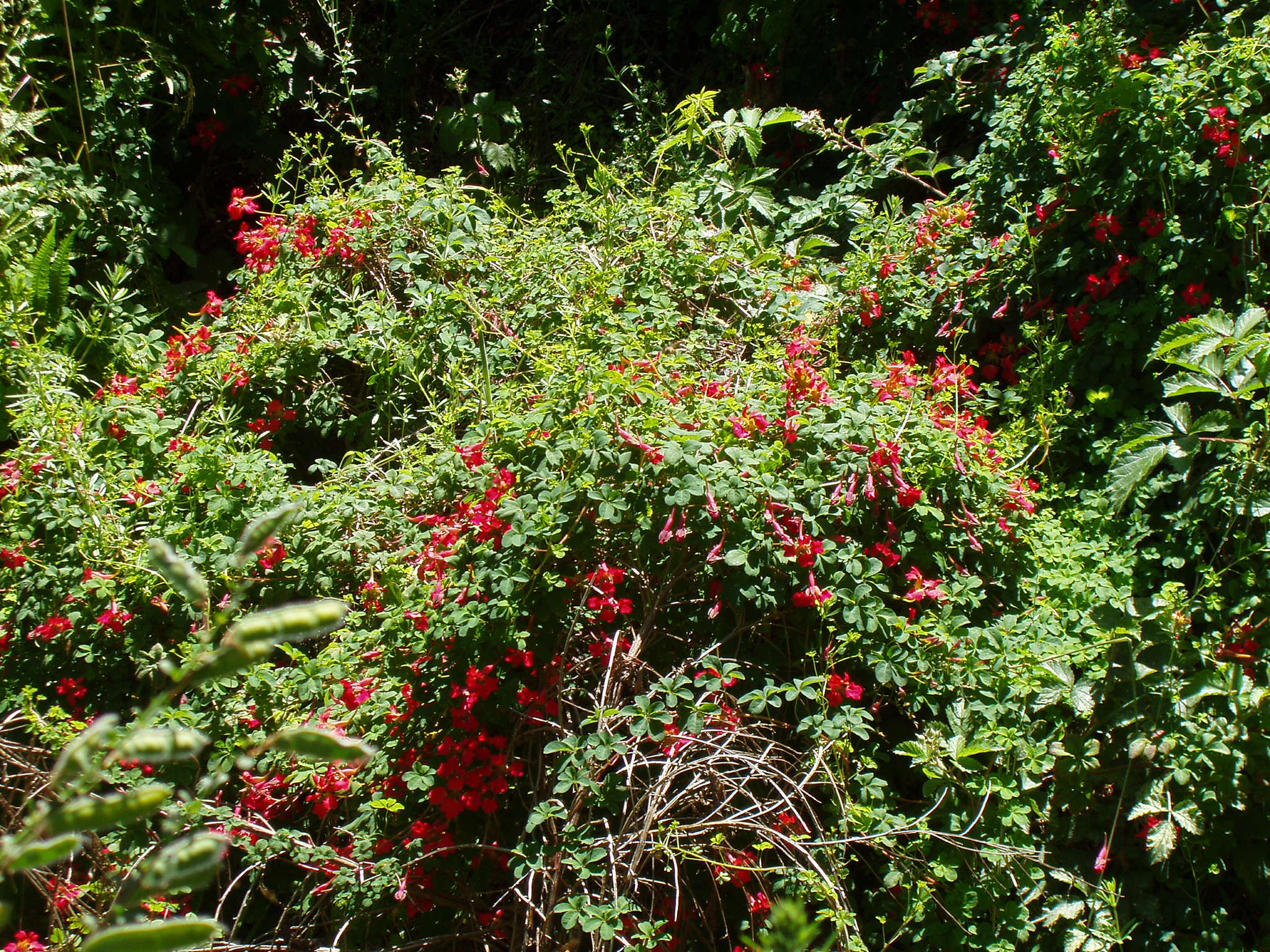
The flame flower (Tropaeolum speciosum), climbs over other plants to a sunlit position

Because gardeners may have different goals, organisms considered "garden pests" vary from gardener to gardener. Tropaeolum speciosum, for example, may be considered a desirable and ornamental garden plant, or it may be considered a pest if its seeds and starts to grow where it is not wanted. As another example, in lawns, moss can become dominant and be impossible to eradicate. In some lawns, lichens, especially very damp lawn lichens such as Peltigera lactucfolia and P. membranacea, can become difficult to control and are considered pests.

=== Pest control ===
There are many ways by which unwanted pests are removed from a garden. The techniques vary depending on the pest, the gardener's goals, and the gardener's philosophy. For example, snails may be dealt with through the use of a chemical pesticide, an organic pesticide, hand-picking, barriers, or simply growing snail-resistant plants.

On a large scale, pest control is often done through the use of pesticides and herbicides, which may be either organic or artificially synthesized. Pesticides may affect the ecology of a garden due to their effects on the populations of both target and non-target species. For example, unintended exposure to some neonicotinoid pesticides has been proposed as a factor in the recent decline in honey bee populations. Pesticides and herbicides are also known to cause medical issues, typically to those in proximity during their application. While farm workers are by far the most affected by the use of pesticides and herbicides, they are often under-informed or accept the consequences due to financial necessity. Fungicides may be applied to the seed coat to reduce mortality of germinating seedlings. The improper use of pesticides often leads to pesticide resistance which poses a risk in global food security. With climate change affecting the distribution of pests, a global increase in pesticide usage has been observed which in turn has caused an increase of human health risks due to exposure. Creating new pesticides in order to manage resistant organisms is an immense expense and is often heavily criticized as an ineffective method of pest control.

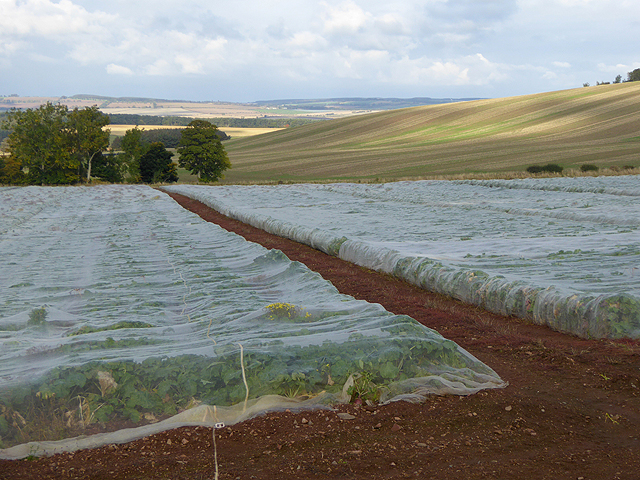
Crop under row cover to protect plants from pest damage.

Other means of control include the removal of infected plants, using fertilizers and bio stimulants to improve the health and vigor of plants so they better resist attack, practicing crop rotation to prevent pest build-up, using foliar sprays, companion planting, and practicing good garden hygiene, such as disinfecting tools and clearing debris and weeds which may harbor pests. Another common method of pest control, used frequently in market gardening, is using insect netting or plastic greenhouse covers. Gardeners may rely on one type of pest in order to eliminate another. Some examples of this are cats which hunt mice and rats, wild birds, bats, chickens, and ducks which hunt insects and slugs, or thorny hedges to deter deer and other creatures. Using these organisms to help control pests is called biological pest control. There are also targeted measures of animal pest control, such as a mole vibrator, which can deter mole activity in a garden, or automated gun shots to scare off birds.

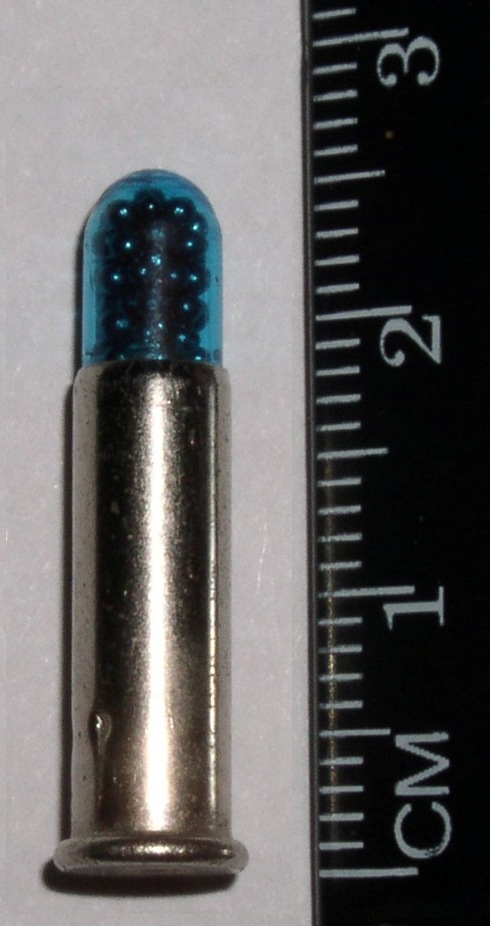
CCI .22LR snake shot loaded with #12 shot

==== Garden guns ====
Garden guns are smooth-bore shotguns specifically made to fire .22 caliber snake shot, and are commonly used by gardeners and farmers for pest control. Garden guns are short-range weapons that can do little harm past 15 to 20 yards (14 to 18 m) and are relatively quiet when fired with snake shot, compared to standard ammunition. These guns are especially effective inside barns and sheds, as the snake shot will not shoot holes in the roof or walls, or more importantly, injure livestock with a ricochet. They are also used for pest control at airports, warehouses, and stockyards.

== Social aspects ==
People can express their political or social views in gardens, intentionally or not. The lawn vs. garden issue is played out in urban planning as the debate over the "land ethic" that is to determine urban land use and whether hyper hygienist bylaws (e.g. weed control) should apply, or whether land should generally be allowed to exist in its natural wild state. In a famous Canadian Charter of Rights case, "Sandra Bell vs. City of Toronto", 1997, the right to cultivate all native species, even most varieties deemed noxious or allergenic, was upheld as part of the right of free expression.

Community gardening comprises a wide variety of approaches to sharing land and gardens.

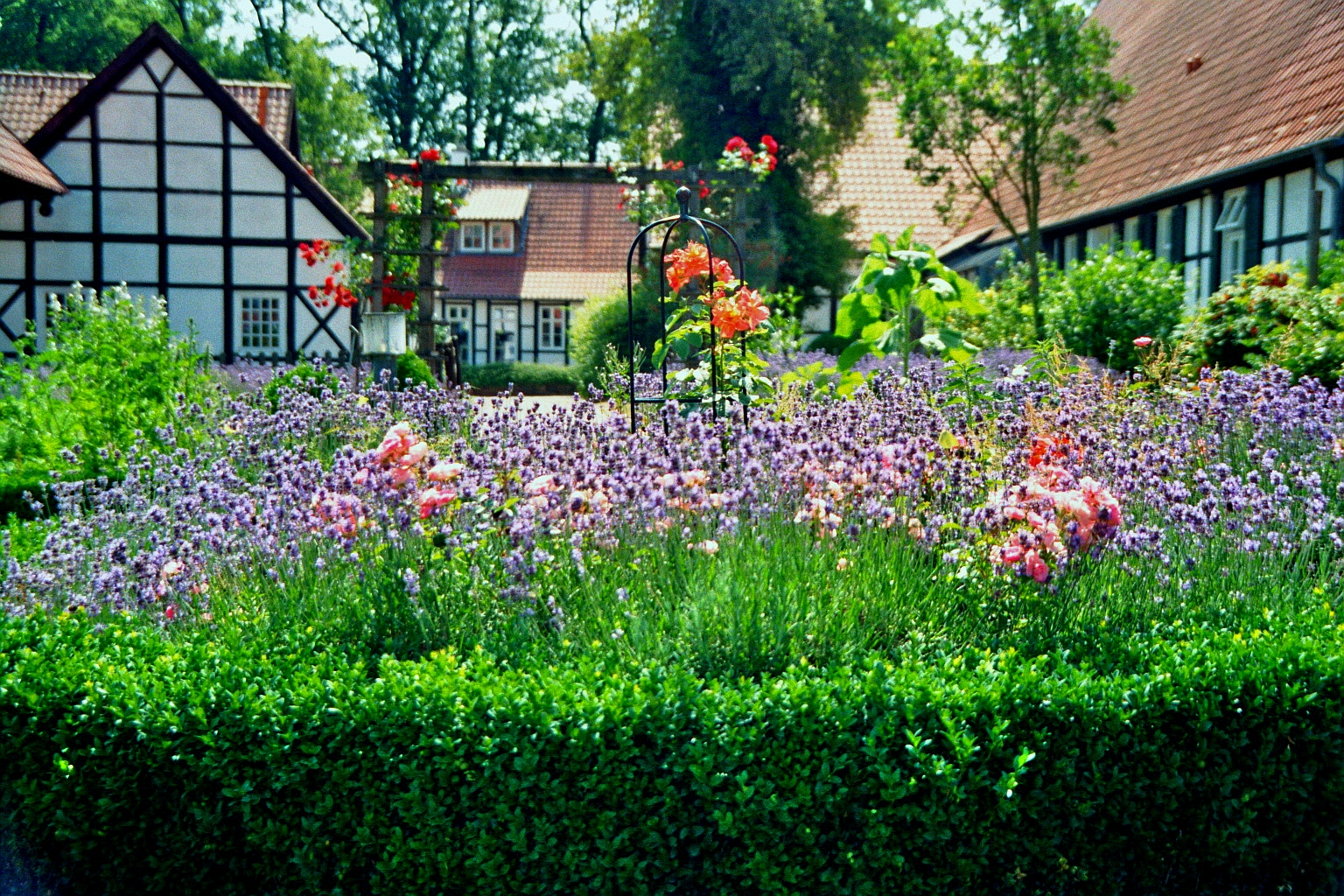
Garden at the Schultenhof in Mettingen, North Rhine-Westphalia, Germany

People often surround their house and garden with a hedge. Common hedge plants are privet, hawthorn, beech, yew, leyland cypress, hemlock, arborvitae, barberry, box, holly, oleander, forsythia, and lavender. The Slow Food movement has sought in some countries to add an edible school yard and garden classrooms to schools, e.g. in Fergus, Ontario, where these were added to a public school to augment the kitchen classroom. Garden sharing, where urban landowners allow gardeners to grow on their property in exchange for a share of the harvest, is associated with the desire to control the quality of one's food, and reconnect with soil and community.

In US and British usage, the production of ornamental plantings around buildings is called landscaping, landscape maintenance, or grounds keeping, while international usage uses the term gardening for these same activities.

Also gaining popularity is the concept of "Green Gardening" which involves growing plants using organic fertilizers and pesticides so that the gardening process – or the flowers and fruits produced thereby – doesn't adversely affect the environment or people's health in any manner.

Gardening is often considered a pleasant and relaxing activity with rewarding results. It allows for a connection with nature and creating a green space that presents beauty and contributes to the eco system. A thriving and flourishing garden can be created by understanding and adapting to the climate and environmental changes.

Plants and flowers grow in varying temperatures and weather conditions. Most plants thrive in temperatures between 18 and 24 °C during the day and slightly cooler at night. This range allows for optimal photosynthesis and overall growth for many common plant species. Usually, there is a variety of plants in a garden, therefore, it is always best to learn about the best weather for your plants to have success with your planting.

=== Laws and restrictions ===
In some parts of the world, particularly the United States, gardening can be restricted by law or by rules and regulations imposed by a Homeowners Association. In the United States, such rules may prohibit homeowners from growing vegetable gardens, prohibit xeriscaping or meadow gardens, or require garden plants to be chosen from a pre-approved list, to preserve the aesthetics of the neighborhood. Numerous challenges to these laws, ordinances and regulations have emerged in recent years, with some resulting in legislation protecting a homeowner's right to cultivate native plants or grow vegetables. Laws protecting a homeowner's right to grow food plants have been termed "right to garden" laws.

== Waste management ==
Yard or garden waste includes leaves, brush, grass clippings, and other organic materials. It can be chipped into a mulch or made into a finished compost that can be sold. In the UK and elsewhere, some local authorities provide a garden waste collection service, which may be charged for, or may be covered within local authority taxation income.

== Benefits ==
Gardening is considered by many people to be a relaxing activity. There are also many studies about the positive effects on mental and physical health in relation to gardening. Specifically, gardening is thought to increase self-esteem and reduce stress. As writer and former teacher Sarah Biddle notes, one's garden may become a "tiny oasis to relax and recharge [one's] batteries." Involving in gardening activities aids in creativity, observational skills, learning, planning and physical movement.

Others consider gardening to be a good hedge against supply chain disruptions, with increased worries that the public cannot always trust that the grocery store shelves will be fully stocked. In April 2022, about 31% of grocery products were out of stock which is an 11% increase from November 2021.

Gardening can also support good numbers and a wide range of pollinators, but worryingly bees and other pollinators are in decline. Gardeners can make a difference to help reverse this trend. The main thing that matters is that they get their share of nectar to fuel their busy lifestyles, and this is where gardening can help them.

A way to both positively impact humans and pollinators is to implement pollinator gardens. Including native flowers has been shown to increase pollinators, and even protects bee populations against urbanization and landscapes that do not include flowers. Small patches in urban landscapes that are diverse in flowers have been noted to match or even exceed wild landscapes when it comes to bees pollinating. Areas like golf courses, cemeteries, community gardens as well as residential gardens are all areas in urban settings that could benefit pollinator diversity by implementing native flowers to the landscape.

== Ornaments and accessories ==
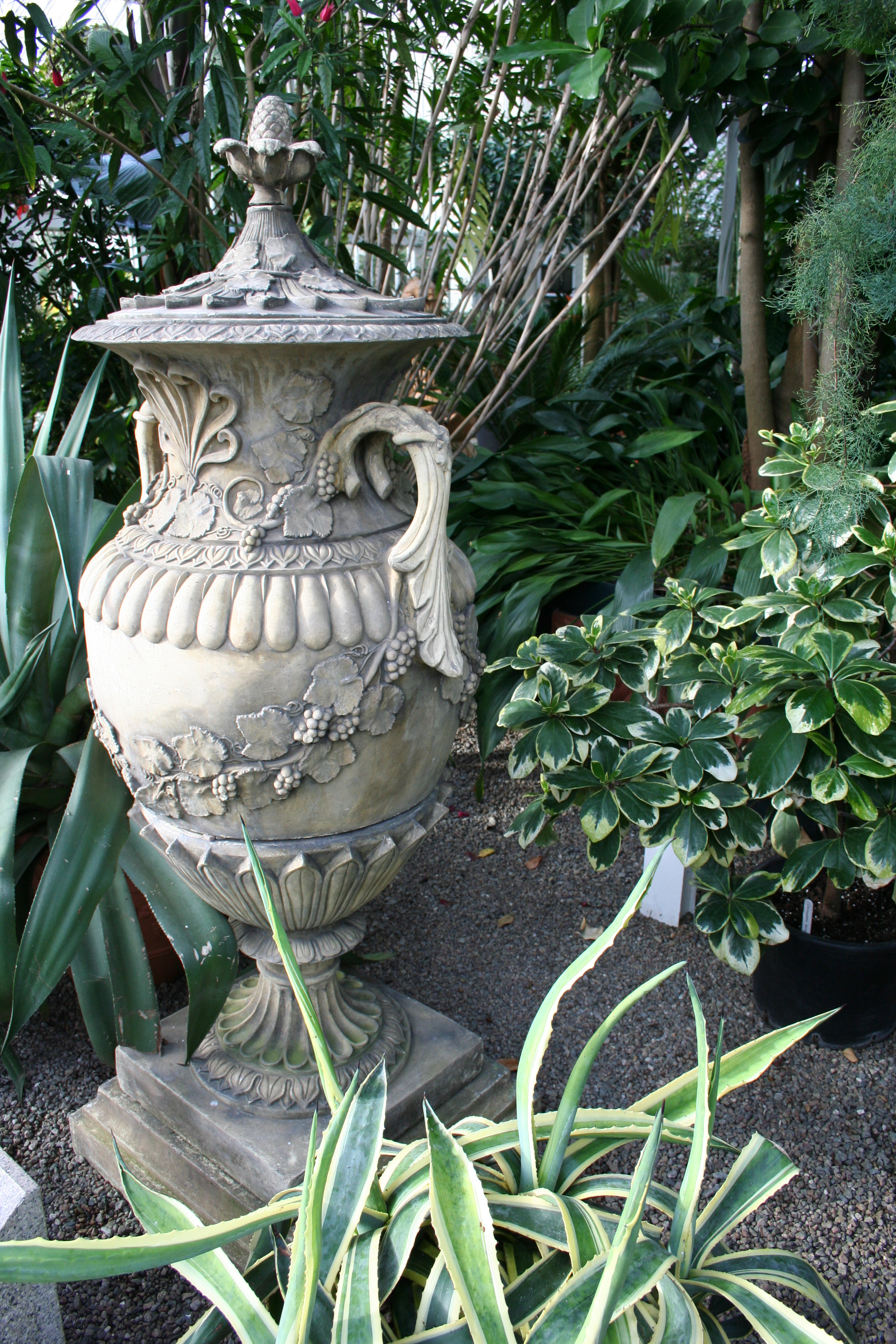
A classical urn at Palm House, the Belfast Botanic Gardens, Northern Ireland, as garden ornament

There is a wide range of garden ornaments and accessories available in the market for both the professional gardener and the amateur to exercise their creativity, for example, sculptures, lights or fountains. These are used to add decoration or functionality, and may be made from a wide range of materials such as copper, stone, wood, bamboo, stainless steel, clay, stained glass, concrete, or iron. Examples include trellis, garden furniture, gnomes, statues, outdoor fireplaces, fountains, rain chains, urns, bird baths and feeders, wind chimes, and garden lighting such as candle lanterns and oil lamps. The use of these items can be part of the expression of a gardener's gardening personality.

== As art ==
Garden design is considered to be an art in most cultures, distinguished from gardening, which generally means garden maintenance. Garden design can include different themes such as perennial, butterfly, wildlife, Japanese, water, tropical, or shade gardens.

In Japan, Samurai and Zen monks were often required to build decorative gardens or practice related skills like flower arrangement known as ikebana. In 18th-century Europe, country estates were refashioned by landscape gardeners into formal gardens or landscaped park lands, such as at Versailles, France, or Stowe, England. Today, landscape architects and garden designers continue to produce artistically creative designs for private garden spaces. In the US, professional landscape designers are certified by the Association of Professional Landscape Designers.

== See also ==
- Arboretum
- Bonsai
- Cultigen
- Eyecatchers
- Garden writing
- Growbag
- Introduced species
- Impact gardening
- List of garden tools
- List of gardening topics
- List of horticulture and gardening books
- List of professional gardeners
- Master gardener program
- No-dig gardening
