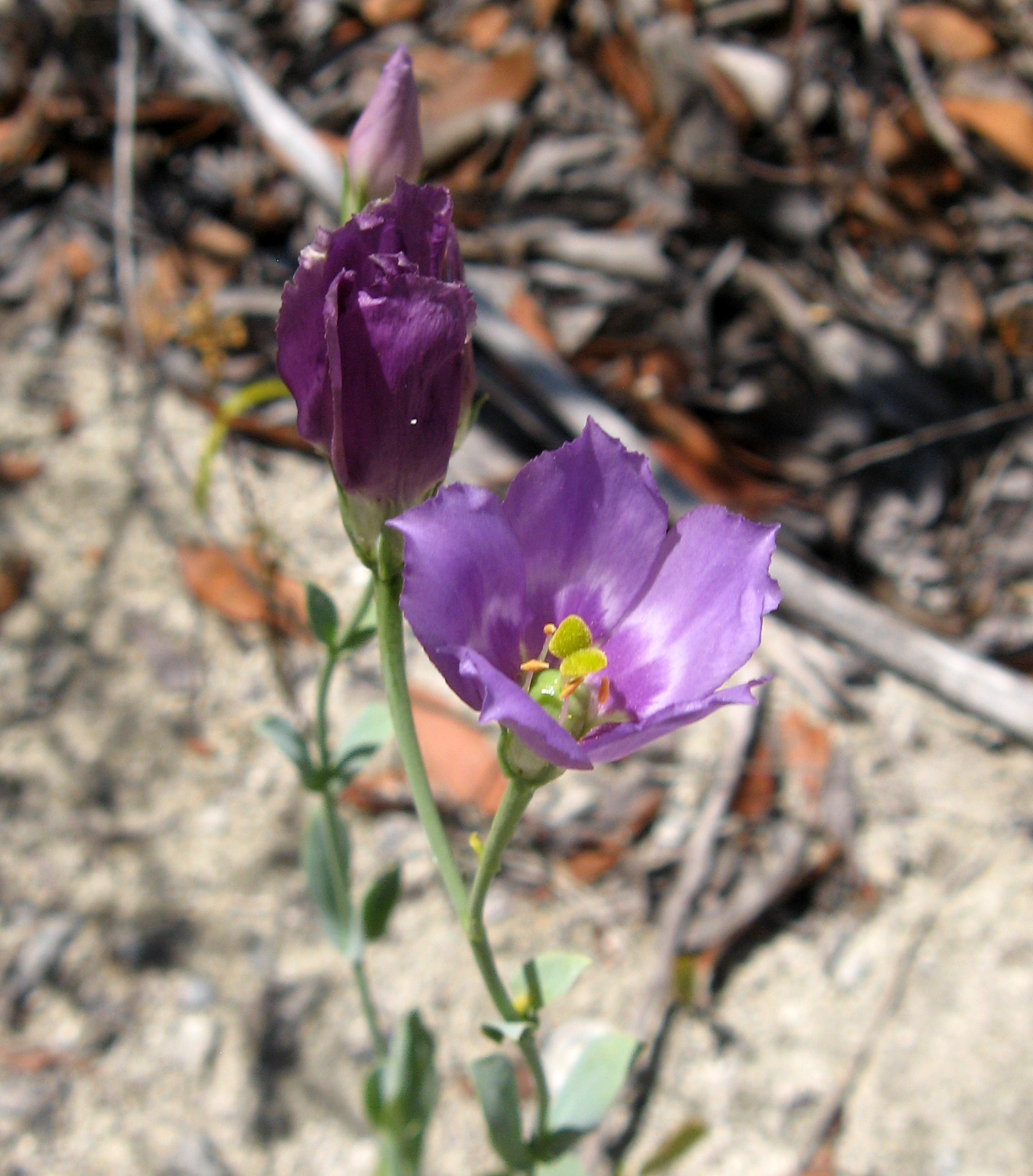

Conservation status
- Secure (NatureServe)

Scientific classification
- Kingdom: Plantae
- Clade: Tracheophytes
- Clade: Angiosperms
- Clade: Eudicots
- Clade: Asterids
- Order: Gentianales
- Family: Gentianaceae
- Genus: Eustoma
- Species: E. exaltatum

Binomial name
- Eustoma exaltatum (L.) Salisb. ex G.Don

Forms
- Eustoma exaltatum f. barkleyi (Standl. ex Shinners) B.L.Turner; Eustoma exaltatum f. exaltatum

= Eustoma exaltatum =

Plant species in the gentian family

Eustoma exaltatum, commonly called seaside gentian, is a species of flowering plant in the gentian family (Gentianaceae).

== Description ==
Eustoma exaltatum is an erect herbaceous plant with a glaucous, leafy stem. It produces large, purple, bell-shaped flowers throughout the growing season, peaking in spring through summer.

Eustoma russellianum is closely related to Eustoma exaltatum, and in some treatments they are ranked as subspecies, rather than as separate species.

== Distribution ==
It is native to North America, where it found in from the southern United States and the West Indies, south to Mexico and Belize. Its natural habitat is wet places, such as alkaline marshes, stream beds, and saline coastal areas. It is moderately tolerant of inundation by salt water, and highly tolerant of salt winds.
