= Lisianthus (disambiguation) =

Lisianthus is a common name for flowers in the genus Eustoma.

Lisianthus may also refer to:

- Lisianthus (character), a fictional character in the anime series Shuffle!

== See also ==
- Lasianthus (sometimes spelled Lisianthus), a plant genus
