= Staub =

Staub (engl. dust, German and Jewish (Ashkenazic): from Middle High German stoup German Staub "dust" a nickname for a miller) is a German-language surname. Notable people with the surname include:

- Chelsea Staub (born 1988), American actress and singer, now credited as Chelsea Kane
- Danielle Staub (born 1962), American television personality, philanthropist and singer
- Ervin Staub (born 1938), American psychologist
- France Staub (1920–2005), Mauritian ornithologist, herpetologist, botanist, and conservationist
- Jacob Staub, rabbi, author and poet
- John F. Staub (1892–1981), American architect from Texas
- Jonny Staub (born 1979), Canadian radio and television personality
- Ralph Staub (1899–1969), movie director, writer and producer
- Ralph Staub (football coach) (1928–2022), American football coach
- Randy Staub, Canadian recording engineer
- Roger Staub (1936–1974), Swiss alpine skier
- Rudolf Staub (1890–1961), Swiss geologist
- Rusty Staub (1944–2018), American baseball player
- Wendy Corsi Staub (born 1964), author
- Victor Staub (1872–1953), French pianist and composer
