= Pubert SAS =

French world-leading tiller manufacturer based in Chantonnay

Pubert is a French company based in Chantonnay, a town of the Western French region of Vendée.

== History ==
The Pubert Company was founded in Chantonnay, France in 1840. Its headquarters and main production site are still there today. The company has been run by the Pubert family for six generations.

Pubert’s founders invented the reversible plow during the first half of the nineteenth century. During the 1960s, Pubert started working on mechanized agricultural tools and released its first motor-powered tiller in 1976.

== Products ==
Pubert manufactures :

- Brushcutters
- Lawn scarifiers
- Dethatcher (accessory to be mounted on tiller)
- Weed whacker (accessory to be mounted on tiller)
- Plows (accessory to be mounted on tiller)
- Furrowing plow (accessory to be mounted on tiller)

Pubert is a supplier for Honda, Husqvarna and Staub.

In 1987, to prove the quality of its tillers, Pubert set a Guinness World Record by running one of its tillers for 24 hours non-stop.

== Figures ==
Revenue (or turnover) : €70 million (in 2008)

Exports: 70% of sales

Production: 200 000 tillers per year – which represents 25-30% of worldwide production.

Production sites :

- Chantonnay, France
- Lons-le-Saunier, France
- Jionan, China (since 2008)

Staff : 200 employees

Internationalization: products sold in 40 countries / 5 continents

== Awards ==
In 2009, Jean-Pierre Pubert (CEO) was elected Western-French entrepreneur of the year.

In 2000, Pubert’s products won the Safety Award at the URBAVERT-URBATEC convention in France.

== Key executives ==
Jean-Pierre Pubert CEO since 1984

Didier Grare : Directing Manager

== Sources ==
- Site Officiel
- EcoMag Tele-Vendée 2009
