= Cultivator =

Farm implement used for secondary tillage

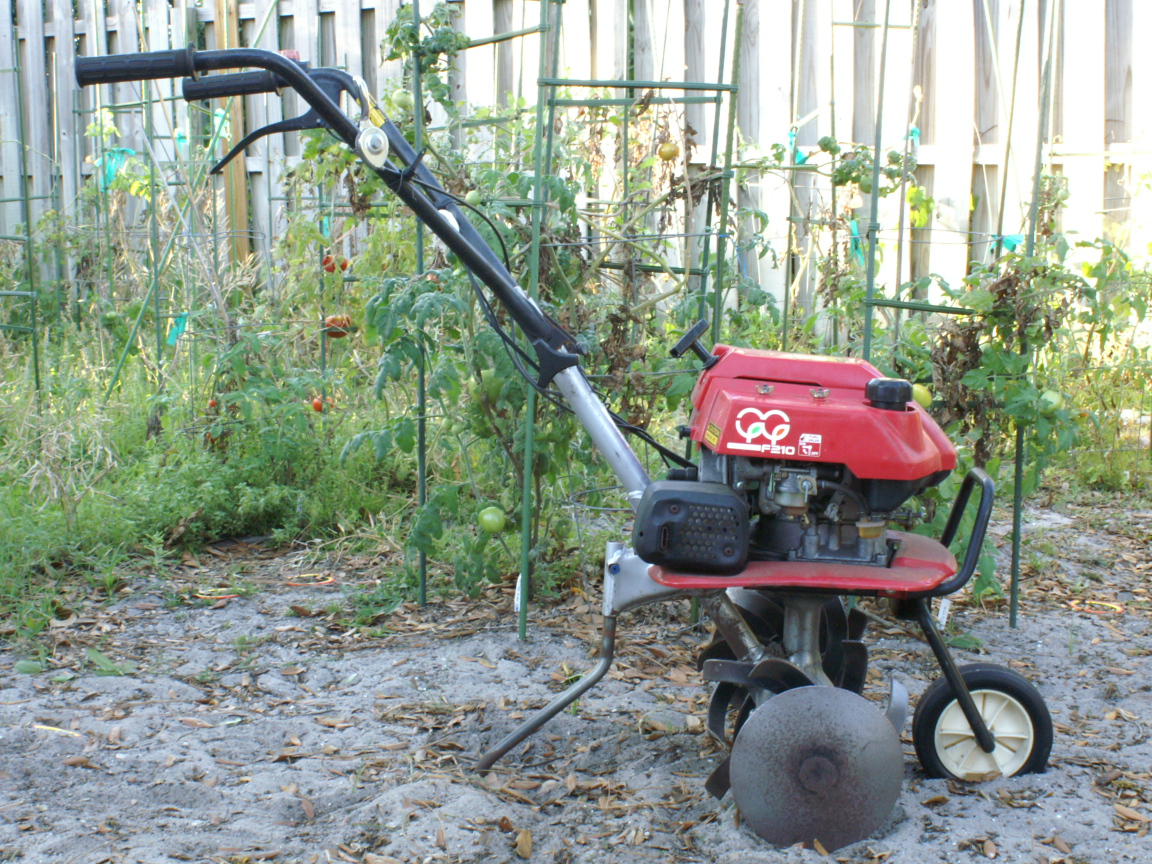
F210 Honda tiller

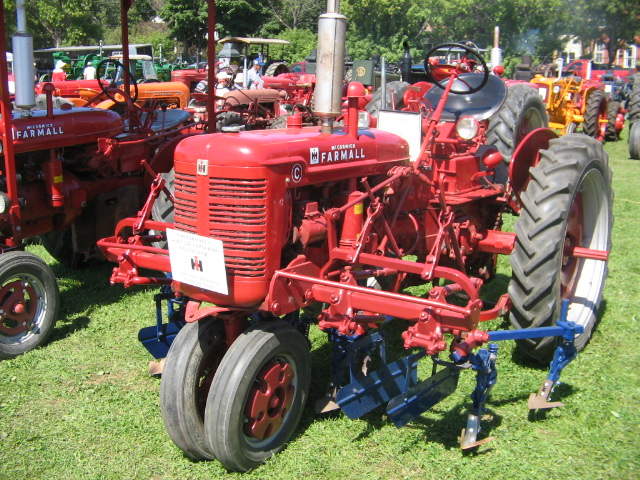
1949 Farmall C with C-254-A two-row cultivator

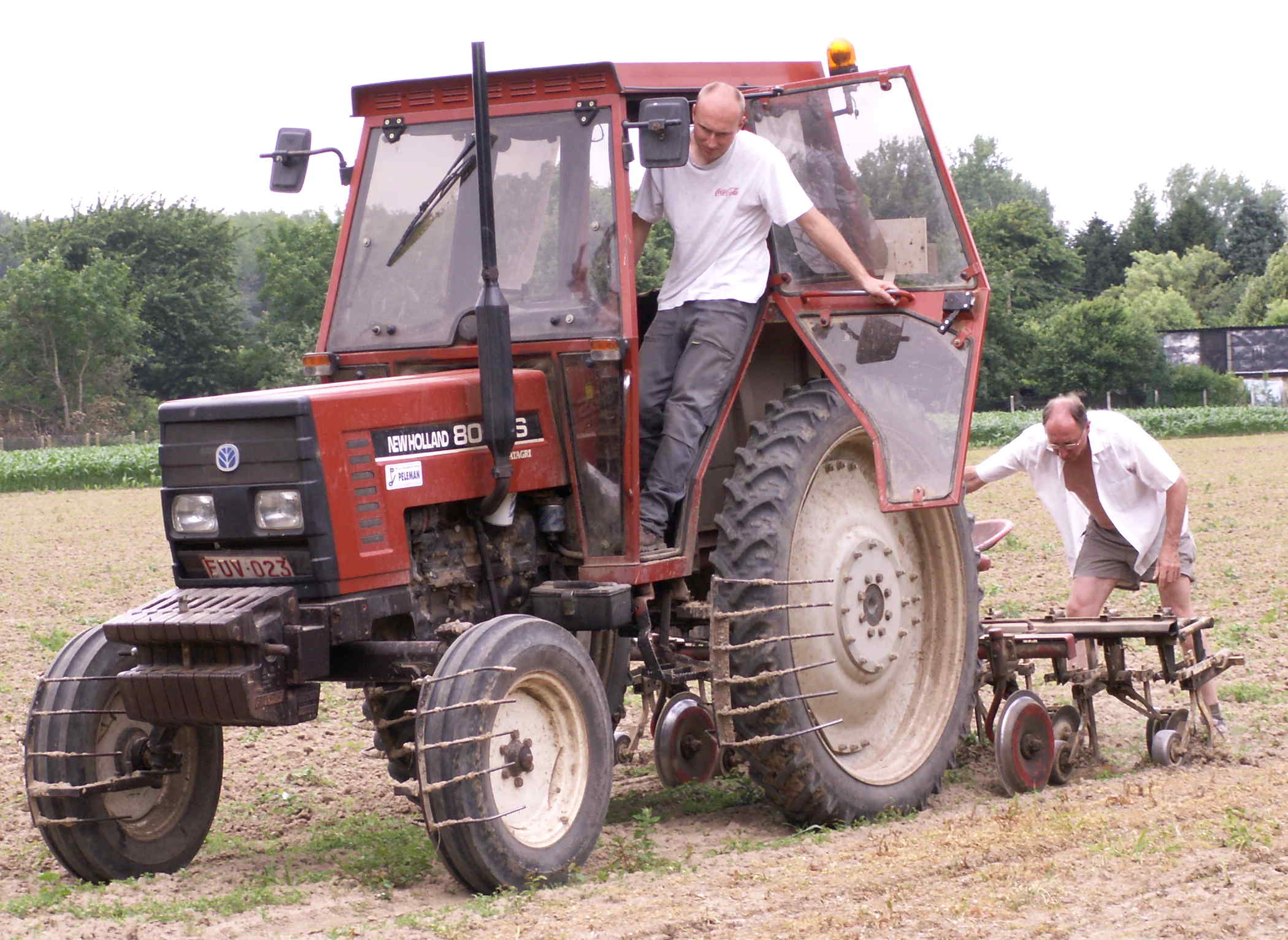
A tractor-mounted tiller

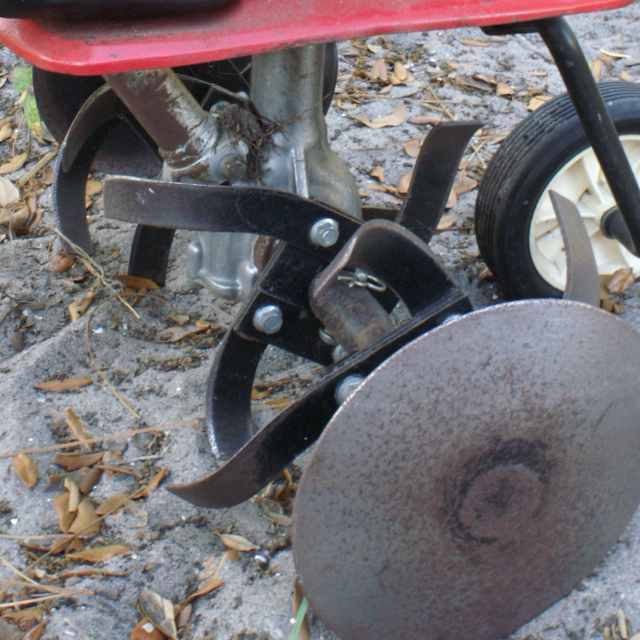
Tines close-up

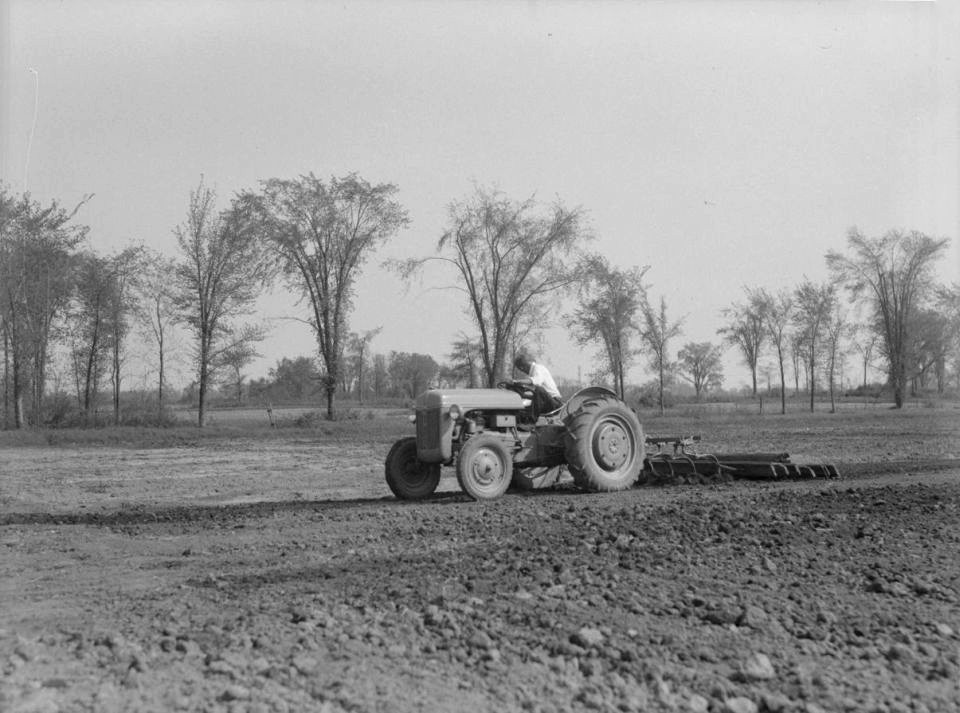
A cultivator pulled by a tractor in Canada in 1943

A cultivator is a piece of agricultural equipment used for secondary tillage. One sense of the name means a frame with teeth (also called shanks) that pierce the soil as they are dragged through it linearly. Another sense of the name means machines that use the rotary motion of disks or teeth to accomplish a similar result, such as a rotary tiller (sometimes called rotavator).

Cultivators stir and pulverize the soil, either before planting (to aerate the soil and prepare a smooth, loose seedbed) or after the crop has begun growing (to kill weeds—controlled disturbance of the topsoil close to the crop plants kills the surrounding weeds by uprooting them, burying their leaves to disrupt their photosynthesis or a combination of both). Unlike a harrow, which disturbs the entire surface of the soil, cultivators are designed to disturb the soil in careful patterns, sparing the crop plants but disrupting the weeds.

Cultivators of the toothed type are often similar in form to chisel plows, but their goals are different. Cultivators' teeth work near the surface, usually for weed control, whereas chisel plow shanks work deep beneath the surface, breaking up the hardened layer on top.

Small toothed cultivators pushed or pulled by a single person are used as garden tools for small-scale gardening, such as for the household's own use or for small market gardens. Similarly sized rotary tillers combine the functions of a harrow and cultivator into one multipurpose machine.

Motorized cultivators can be self-propelled, or can be drawn as an attachment behind either a two-wheel tractor or four-wheel tractor. On two-wheel tractors, they are usually rigidly attached to the tractor and powered via couplings to the tractor's transmission. On four-wheel tractors they are usually attached by means of a three-point hitch and driven by a power take-off. Drawbar hookup is also still commonly used worldwide. Draft-animal power is sometimes still used for cultivators, being somewhat common in developing nations although rare in more industrialized economies.

== History ==
The basic idea of soil scratching for weed control is ancient and was done with hoes or plough for millennia before any larger or more complex equipment was developed to reduce the manual labor and to speed the work. The notion of ganging several hoes together and applying draft animal power to drag them led to harrows, which while newer than the hoe are still quite ancient. In the eighteenth and nineteenth centuries, as the Industrial Revolution developed, a proliferation of cultivator designs proceeded. These new cultivators were drawn by draft animals (such as horses, mules, or oxen) or were pushed or drawn by people, depending on the need and expense.

The powered rotary hoe was invented by Arthur Clifford Howard who, in 1912, began experimenting with rotary tillage on his father's farm at Gilgandra, New South Wales, Australia. Initially using his father's steam tractor engine as a power source, he found that ground could be mechanically tilled without soil-packing occurring, as was the case with normal ploughing. His earliest designs threw the tilled soil sideways, until he improved his invention by designing an L-shaped blade mounted on widely spaced flanges fixed to a small-diameter rotor. With fellow apprentice Everard McCleary, he established a company to make his machine, but plans were interrupted by World War I. In 1919 Howard returned to Australia and resumed his design work, patenting a design with 5 rotary hoe cultivator blades and an internal combustion engine in 1920.

In March 1922, Howard formed the company Austral Auto Cultivators Pty Ltd, which later became known as Howard Auto Cultivators. It was based in Northmead, a suburb of Sydney, from 1927.

Meanwhile, in North America during the 1910s, tractors were evolving away from traction engine–sized monsters toward smaller, lighter, more affordable machines. The Fordson tractor especially had made tractors affordable and practical for small and medium family farms for the first time in history. Cultivating was somewhat of an afterthought in the Fordson's design, which reflected the fact that even just bringing practical motorized tractive power alone to this market segment was in itself a milestone. This left an opportunity for others to pursue better motorized cultivating. Between 1915 and 1920, various inventors and farm implement companies experimented with a class of machines referred to as motor cultivators, which were simply modified horse-drawn shank-type cultivators with motors added for self-propulsion. This class of machines found limited market success. But by 1921 International Harvester had combined motorized cultivating with the other tasks of tractors (tractive power and belt work) to create the Farmall, the general-purpose tractor tailored to cultivating that basically invented the category of row-crop tractors.

In Australia, by the 1930s, Howard was finding it increasingly difficult to meet a growing worldwide demand for exports of his machines. He travelled to the United Kingdom, founding the company Rotary Hoes Ltd in East Horndon, Essex, in July 1938. Branches of this new company subsequently opened in the United States of America, South Africa, Germany, France, Italy, Spain, Brazil, Malaysia, Australia and New Zealand. It later became the holding company for Howard Rotavator Co. Ltd. The Howard Group of companies was acquired by the Danish Thrige Agro Group in 1985, and in December 2000 the Howard Group became a member of Kongskilde Industries of Soroe, Denmark.

In modern commercial agriculture, the amount of cultivating done for weed control has been greatly reduced via use of herbicides instead. However, herbicides are not always desirable—for example, in organic farming. When herbicidal weed control was first widely commercialized in the 1950s and 1960s, it played into that era's optimistic worldview in which sciences such as chemistry would usher in a new age of modernity that would leave old-fashioned practices (such as weed control via cultivators) in the dustbin of history. Thus, herbicidal weed control was adopted very widely, and in some cases too heavily and hastily. In subsequent decades, people overcame this initial imbalance and came to realize that herbicidal weed control has limitations and externalities, and it must be managed intelligently. It is still widely used, and probably will continue to be indispensable to affordable food production worldwide for the foreseeable future; but its wise management includes seeking alternate methods, such as the traditional standby of mechanical cultivation, where practical.

== Industrial use ==
To the extent that cultivating is done commercially today (such as in truck farming), it is usually powered by tractors, especially row-crop tractors. Industrial cultivators can vary greatly in size and shape, from 10 feet (3 m) to 80 feet (24 m) wide. Many are equipped with hydraulic wings that fold up to make road travel easier and safer. Different types are used for preparation of fields before planting, and for the control of weeds between row crops. The cultivator may be an implement trailed after the tractor via a drawbar; mounted on the three-point hitch; or mounted on a frame beneath the tractor. Active cultivator implements are driven by a power take-off shaft. While most cultivator are considered a secondary tillage implement, active cultivators are commonly used for primary tillage in lighter soils instead of plowing. The largest versions available are about 6 m (20 ft) wide, and require a tractor with an excess of 150 horsepower (110 kW) (PTO) to drive them.

Field cultivators are used to complete tillage operations in many types of arable crop fields. The main function of the field cultivator is to prepare a proper seedbed for the crop to be planted into, to bury crop residue in the soil (helping to warm the soil before planting), to control weeds, and to mix and incorporate the soil to ensure the growing crop has enough water and nutrients to grow well during the growing season. The implement has many shanks mounted on the underside of a metal frame, and small narrow rods at the rear of the machine that smooth out the soil surface for easier travel later when planting. In most field cultivators, one-to-many hydraulic cylinders raise and lower the implement and control its depth.

=== Row crop cultivators ===
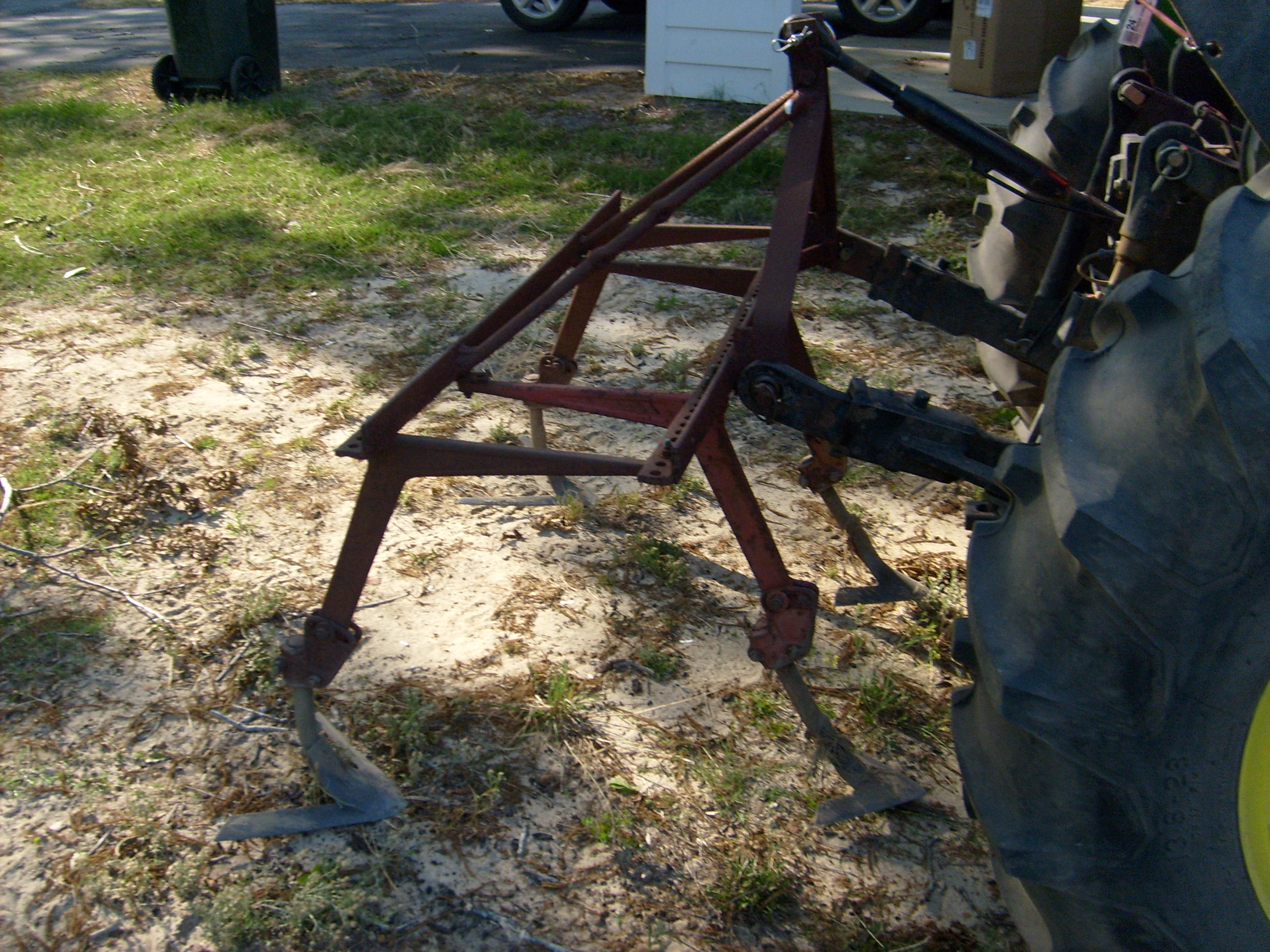
Homemade sweep. Notice the inner and outer "sweep" blades.

The main function of the row crop cultivator is weed control between the rows of an established crop. Row crop cultivators are usually raised and lowered by a three-point hitch and the depth is controlled by gauge wheels.

Sometimes referred to as sweep cultivators, these commonly have two center blades that cut weeds from the roots near the base of the crop and turn over soil, while two rear sweeps further outward than the center blades deal with the center of the row, and can be anywhere from 1 to 36 rows wide.

== Garden cultivators ==
Small tilling equipment, used in small gardens such as household gardens and small commercial gardens, can provide both primary and secondary tillage. For example, a rotary tiller does both the "plowing" and the "harrowing", preparing a smooth, loose seedbed. It does not provide the row-wise weed control that cultivator teeth would. For that task, there are single-person-pushable toothed cultivators.

=== Variants and trademarks ===
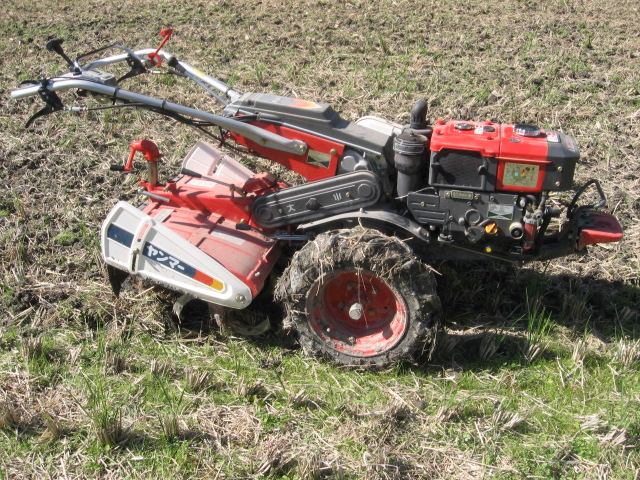
A Japanese two-wheel tractor

Rotary tillers are a type of cultivator. They are popular with home gardeners who want large vegetable gardens. The garden may be tilled a few times before planting each crop. Rotary tillers may be rented from tool rental centers for single-use applications, such as when planting grass.

Rototiller
The small rototiller is typically propelled by a 1–5 hp (1–4 kW) petrol engine rotating the tines, some have powered wheels, though they may have small transport/level control wheel(s). To keep the machine from moving forward too fast, an adjustable tine is usually fixed just behind the blades so that through friction with deeper un-tilled soil, it acts as a brake, slowing the machine and allowing it to pulverize the soils. The slower a rototiller moves forward, the more soil tilth can be obtained. The operator can control the amount of friction/braking action by raising and lowering the handlebars of the tiller. Rototillers often do not have a reverse as such backwards movement towards the operator could cause serious injury. While operating, the rototiller can be pulled backwards to go over areas that were not pulverized enough, but care must be taken to ensure that the operator does not stumble and pull the rototiller on top of themselves. Rototilling is much faster than manual tilling, but notoriously difficult to handle and exhausting work, especially in the heavier and higher power models. If the rototiller's blades catch on unseen subsurface objects, such as tree roots and buried garbage, it can cause the rototiller to abruptly and violently move in an unexpected direction.
Rotavator
Unlike the Rototiller, the self-propelled Howard Rotavator is equipped with a gearbox and driven forward, or held back, by its wheels. The gearbox enables the forward speed to be adjusted while the rotational speed of the tines remains constant which enables the operator to easily regulate the extent to which soil is engaged. For a two-wheel tractor rotavator this greatly reduces the workload of the operator as compared to a rototiller. These rotavators are generally more heavy duty, come in 4–18 hp (3–13 kW) versions with either a petrol or diesel engine and can cover larger areas.
Mini tiller
Mini tillers are a new type of small agricultural tillers or cultivators, used by farmers or homeowners. These are also known as power tillers or garden tillers. Compact, powerful and, most importantly, inexpensive, these agricultural rotary tillers are providing alternatives to four-wheel tractors and in the small farmers' fields in developing countries are more economical than four-wheel tractors.
Two-wheel tractor
The higher power "riding" rotavators cross out of the home garden category into farming category, especially in Europe, capable of preparing 1 hectare of land in 8–10 hours. These are also known as walk-behind tractors or walking tractors. Years ago they were considered only useful for rice growing areas, where they were fitted with steel cage-wheels for traction, but now the same are being used in both wetland and dryland farming all over the world. They have multiple functions with related tools for dryland or paddys, pumping, transportation, threshing, ditching, spraying pesticide. They can be used on hills, mountains, in greenhouses and orchards.

== See also ==
- Cultivator No. 6
- Pubert SAS
