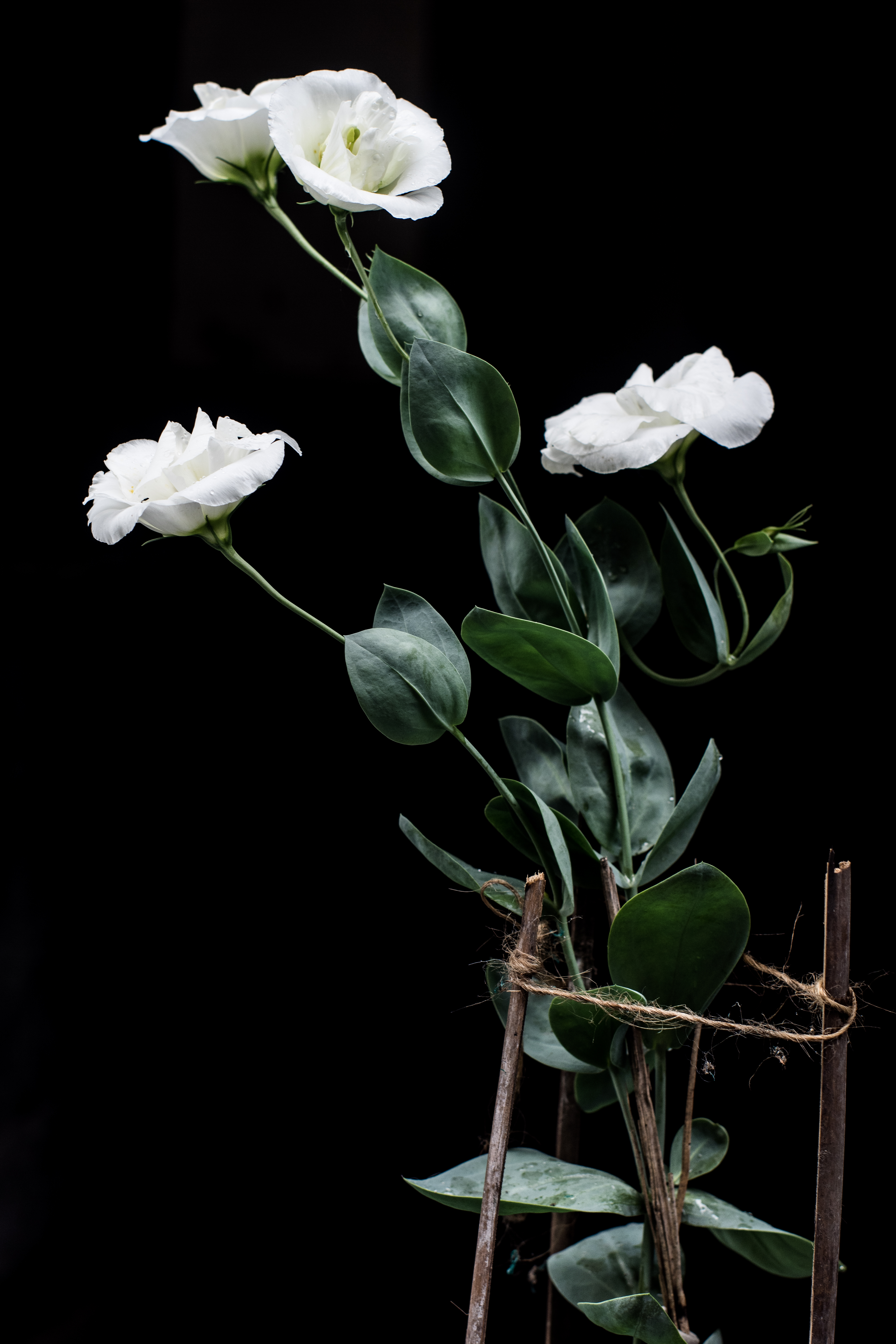
- Eustoma russellianum

Scientific classification
- Kingdom: Plantae
- Clade: Tracheophytes
- Clade: Angiosperms
- Clade: Eudicots
- Clade: Asterids
- Order: Gentianales
- Family: Gentianaceae
- Tribe: Chironieae
- Subtribe: Chironiinae
- Genus: Eustoma; Salisb. (1806)

Species
- Eustoma exaltatum; Eustoma russellianum

= Eustoma =

Genus of flowering plants

Eustoma, commonly known as lisianthus or prairie gentian, is a small genus of plants in the gentian family. They are native to warm regions of the southern United States, Mexico, Caribbean and northern South America. This genus is typically found in grasslands and in areas of disturbed ground.

== Description ==
They are herbaceous annuals, growing to 15–60 cm (6–24 in) tall, with bluish green, slightly succulent leaves and large funnel-shaped flowers growing on long straight stems: sometimes erect single stems, other times branching stems. The flowers can grow up to 50 millimetres (2 in) across and can be found in a variety of colors. They have been found in all shades of pink, purple, white, and blue. In addition, some are bicolored and some are occasionally found in yellow or carmine-red.

Eustoma flowers are either single-flowered or double-flowered. Both types of flowers can be found in all ranges of the possible colors listed above. They are usually 30–90 cm (1–3 ft) tall, although there are dwarf varieties that only grow up to 200 mm (8 in) in height.

== Taxonomy ==
Eustoma (YOO-sto-ma) is a small genus, containing only two or three species.

The genus name Eustoma is a compound of the Greek prefix εὐ- (eu-), "good, well", and Greek στόμα (stóma), "mouth", hence "(having a) pleasing mouth", while the obsolete Lisianthus is a compound of λισσός (lissós), "smooth", and ἄνθος (ánthos), "flower".

== Cultivation ==
Eustoma is a beautiful, high-end cut flower, but it is tricky to grow and requires some maintenance. It has tiny seeds that must be sown on the surface, not buried, and it must be planted in rich, well-drained soil and exposed to full sun. It must be kept moist but not overwatered: overwatering may result in the growth and development of fungal diseases. Careful control of temperature is necessary to prevent rosetting and cultivation under cover is recommended to prevent spotting on the petals. Lisianthus flowers will begin to bloom in early summer and some will continue to bloom throughout the later months of the summer. When cut, Lisianthus flowers can last anywhere from two to three weeks in a vase.

Eustoma russellianum is particularly popular and has a number of cultivars that are grown for the cut-flower market.

== Gallery ==
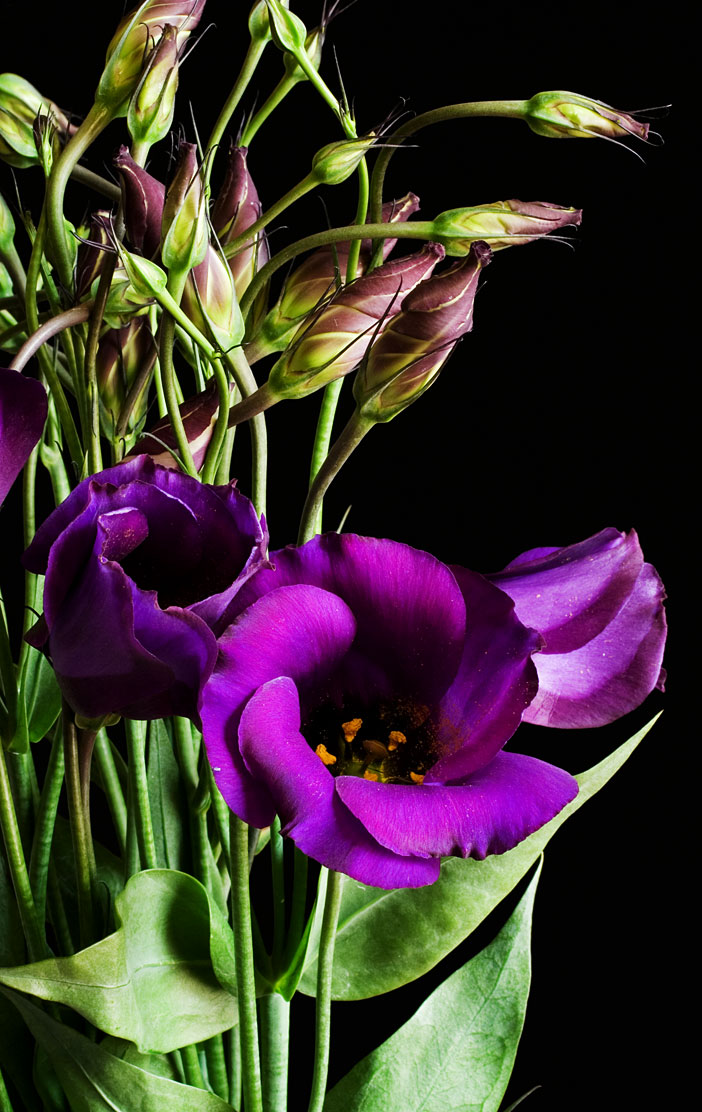
