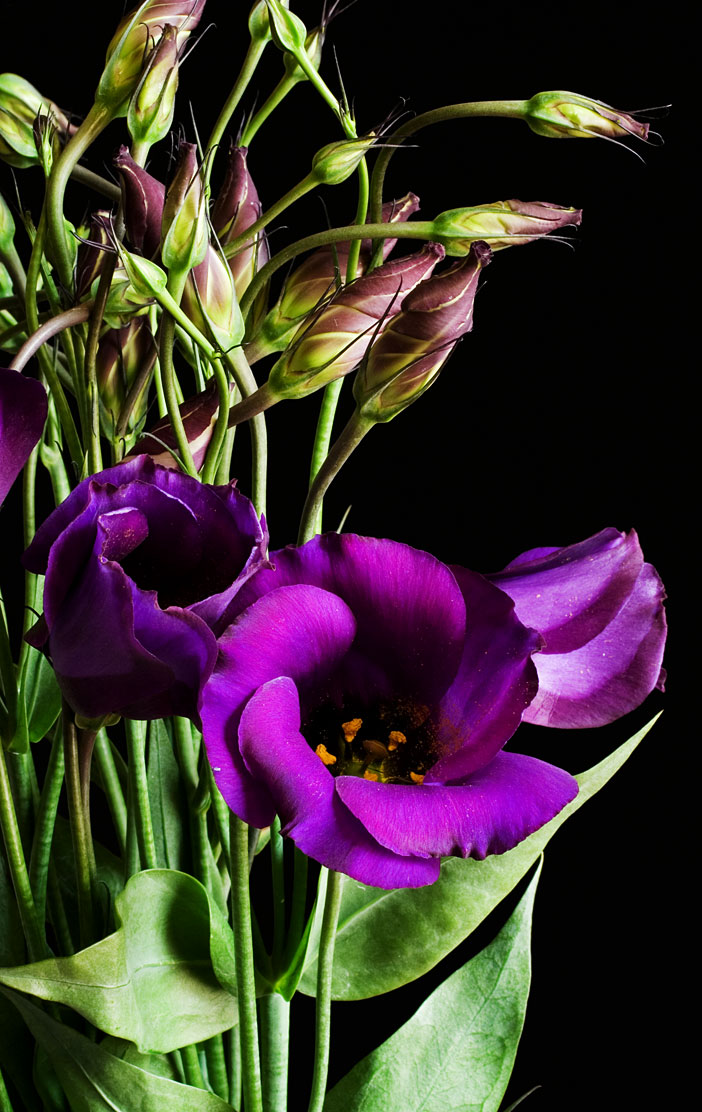

Scientific classification
- Kingdom: Plantae
- Clade: Tracheophytes
- Clade: Angiosperms
- Clade: Eudicots
- Clade: Asterids
- Order: Gentianales
- Family: Gentianaceae
- Genus: Eustoma
- Species: E. russellianum

Binomial name
- Eustoma russellianum (Hook.) G.Don

Synonyms
- List: Bilamista grandiflora Raf. (1838); Eustoma andrewsii A.Nelson (1904); Eustoma exaltatum subsp. russellianum (Hook.) Kartesz (1999); Eustoma gracile Engelm. ex Small (1903); Eustoma grandiflorum (Raf.) Shinners (1957); Eustoma grandiflorum f. album (Holz.) Waterf. (1960); Eustoma grandiflorum f. bicolor (Standl.) Shinners (1957); Eustoma grandiflorum f. fisheri (Standl.) Shinners (1957); Eustoma grandiflorum f. flaviflorum (Cockerell) Shinners (1957); Eustoma grandiflorum f. roseum (Standl.) Shinners (1957); Eustoma russellianum f. album Holz. (1892); Eustoma russellianum f. bicolor Standl. (1940); Eustoma russellianum f. fisheri Standl. (1932); Eustoma russellianum f. flaviflorum Cockerell (1924); Eustoma russellianum var. flavum A.M.Davis (1945); Eustoma russellianum var. gracile A.Gray (1878); Eustoma russellianum f. leucantha Greenm. (1912); Eustoma russellianum f. roseum Standl. (1940); Lisianthius glaucifolius Nutt. (1835); Lisianthius russellianus Hook. (1838); Urananthus russelianus Benth. (1840)

= Eustoma russellianum =

Plant species in the gentian family

Eustoma russellianum is a species of flowering plant in the gentian family. One of its previous binomial names was Eustoma grandiflorum. Common names include showy prairie gentian, prairie gentian, Texas bluebells, Texas bluebell, bluebell, and Lisianthus.

There is a cultivar, 'Bolero Deep Blue'.

== Description ==
Eustoma russellianum has blue-green waxy leaves and showy bell shaped flowers in blue pink or white each borne singly on an upright plant. Depending on growing conditions it may present as an annual, biennial, or perennial plant.

== Distribution and habitat ==
It is found primarily in the Great Plains region of North America, from Wyoming southeast to Nebraska, and south to Texas and Mexico. Due to its popularity and the frequency with which it is picked, it has been unable to naturally reseed itself in its native distribution.

It prefers moist, sandy soils and often grows near streams, creek-beds, moist meadows, and springs.

== Cultivation ==
Prairie gentian is a popular garden flower, and has been cultivated in Japan for over 70 years. Many varieties, including those with double petals, or a variety of colored flowers, have been developed. It is not often attempted in native wildflower gardens due to its high moisture requirements and short lifespan.

== Diseases ==
Fungal diseases
Botrytis blight	Botrytis cinerea
Cercospora leaf spot	Cercospora eustomae
Curvularia blotch	Curvularia sp.
Downy mildew	Peronospora chlorae
Fusarium stem rot	Fusarium solani Fusarium avenaceum
Fusarium wilt	Fusarium oxysporum
Phyllosticta leaf spot	Phyllosticta sp.
Pythium root rot	Pythium sp.
Rhizoctonia stem rot	Rhizoctonia solani
Sclerophoma stem blight	Sclerophoma eustomis

=== Viral and viroid diseases ===
Viral and viroid diseases
Bean yellow mosaic	genus Potyvirus, Bean yellow mosaic virus (BYMV)
Cucumber mosaic	genus Cucumovirus, Cucumber mosaic virus (CMV)
Impatiens necrotic spot	genus Tospovirus, Impatiens necrotic spot virus (INSV)
Lisianthus necrosis	Lisianthus necrosis virus (LNV)
Tobacco mosaic	genus Tobamovirus, Tobacco mosaic virus (TMV)
