= Rudolf Staub =

Swiss geologist (1890–1961)

Rudolf Staub (19 January 1890 – 25 June 1961) was a Swiss field geologist who examined mountain formation and tectonics in the Alps. He produced high resolution maps including the first to indicate tectonic regions in the Swiss Alps and argued that mountain formation was caused by alternating tectonic forces, Polflucht and Poldrift, as suggested by Alfred Wegener.

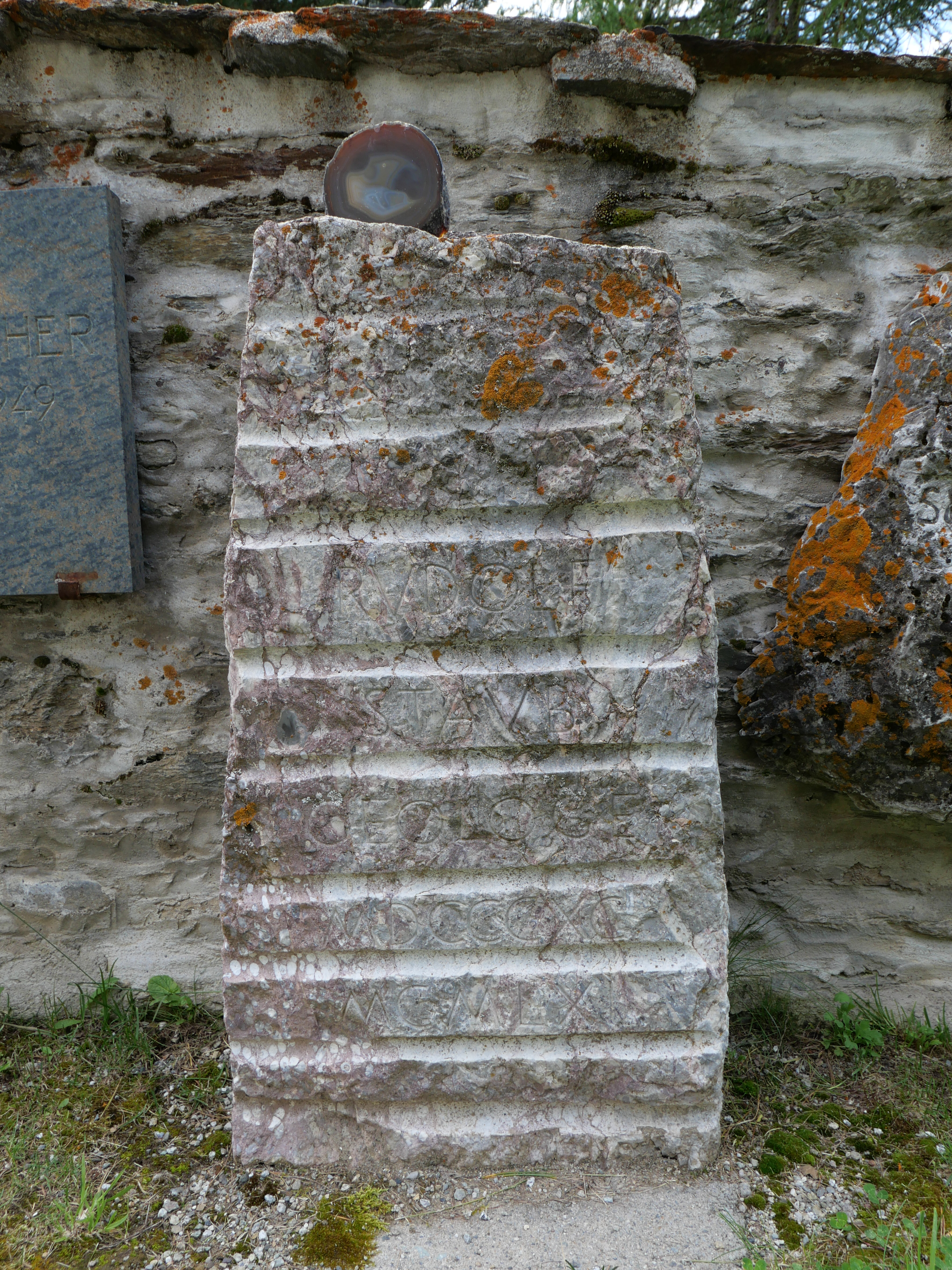
The tombstone in 2024.

Staub was born in Glarus where his father ran a textile mill. After the death of his father, his mother managed the mill, but she too died before Staub reached twelve. After school at Trogen, he went to study mechanical engineering at ETH Zurich but he shifted to study geology at the University of Zurich. He studied under Albert Heim and Jakob Oberholzer and worked on his doctoral thesis under Johann Ulrich Grubenmann, examining the Bernina region using the idea nappes. He served in the army during World War I and mapped the Val Bregaglia. He then taught at the ETH Zurich from 1926 and became a full professor two years later, succeeding Hans Schardt. During World War II he headed the geological services unit of the Swiss Army, helping in the construction of dams for power production. In 1924 he worked on how the Alps were formed, building on the work of Emile Argand. Some of his conclusions were not accepted even by Argand. Staub suggested the position of an orogenic arc, known as the "Castilian Bend", which was questioned by many others and was largely forgotten until it was rediscovered in 2004 and identified as part of the orocline now called the Central Iberian arc. Staub owned a car, possessed private means to support himself, travelled widely, and was an able mountaineer, unlike many of his contemporaries. Outside of the Alps, he also explored Italy, Spain and Morocco.

Staub received the Eduard Suess Medal. He found his final resting place in the cemetery of the 15th-century mountain church of Fex-Crasta in the Fex Valley, which forms part of the municipality of Sils im Engadin/Segl, a village in the Swiss canton of Graubünden.
