= Overwatering =

Common cause of death in houseplants

Overwatering is a phenomenon that often happens in houseplants due to excessive watering, as this excess water can deplete oxygen from the soil and encourage the growth of harmful bacteria and fungi

== Symptoms ==
Overwatering often causes plants to have:

- Yellow or brown leaves that have started to droop
- Shedding leaves that are both new and old
- Multiple brown spots and mold on them
- Their soil seems to have a foul odor
- Grey, foul smelling and mushy leaves

== Cures ==
The main method of fixing a plant that has been overwatered is to ensure there are enough drainage holes in the pot to let excess water out of the soil. It is also recommended to trim off any leaves or roots that are dead, mushy, or wilting.
