= Biointensive agriculture =

Organic agricultural system based on maximum yield

Biointensive agriculture is an organic agricultural system that focuses on achieving maximum yields from a minimum area of land, while simultaneously increasing biodiversity and sustaining the soil fertility. The goal of the method is long term sustainability on a closed system basis. It is particularly effective for backyard gardeners and smallholder farmers in developing countries, and also has been used successfully on small-scale commercial farms.

== History ==
Many of the techniques that contribute to the biointensive method were present in the agriculture of the ancient Chinese, Greeks, Mayans, and of the Early Modern period in Europe, as well as in West Africa (Tapades of Fouta Djallon) from at least the late 18th century.

Sustainable bio-intensive farming (BIF) system, which emphasizes biodiversity conservation; recycling of nutrients; synergy among crops, animals, soils, and other biological components; and regeneration and conservation of resources is a type of agro-ecological approach. This alternative approach can appropriately address the central issue of hunger, poverty, food / nutrition insecurity and livelihoods (Rajbhandari, 1999).

== System ==
The biointensive method provides many benefits as compared with conventional farming and gardening methods, and is an inexpensive, easily implemented sustainable production method that can be used by people who lack the resources (or desire) to implement commercial chemical and fossil-fuel-based forms of agriculture.

Ecology Action's research (Jeavons, J.C., 2001. Biointensive Mini-Farming Journal of Sustainable Agriculture (Vol. 19 (2), 2001, p. 81-83) shows that biointensive methods can enable small-scale farms and farmers to significantly increase food production and income, utilize predominantly local, renewable resources and decrease expense and energy inputs while building fertile topsoil at a rate 60 times faster than in nature (Worldwide Loss of Soil – and a Possible Solution Ecology Action, 1996).

According to Jeavons and other proponents, when properly implemented, farmers using biointensive techniques have the potential to:

- Use 67% to 88% less water than conventional agricultural methods.
- Use 50% to 100% less purchased (organic, locally available) fertilizer.
- Use up to 99% less energy than commercial agriculture, while using a fraction of the resources.
- Produce 2 to 6 times more food at intermediate yields, assuming a reasonable level of farmer skill and soil fertility (which increase over time as the method is practiced)
- Produce a 100% increase in soil fertility.
- Reduce by 50% or more the amount of land required to grow a comparable amount of food. This allows more land to remain in a wild state, preserving ecosystem services and promoting genetic diversity.

In order to achieve these benefits, the biointensive method uses an eight-part integrated system of deep soil cultivation (“double-digging”) to create raised, aerated beds; intensive planting; companion planting; composting; the use of open-pollinated seeds; and a carefully balanced planting ratio of 60% Carbon-Rich Crops (for compost production) 30% Calorie-Rich Crops (for food) and an optional 10% planted in Income Crops (for sale).

The following outline of the methods approximates the descriptions found in the popular biointensive handbook, How to Grow More Vegetables (and fruits, nuts, berries, grains and other crops) Than You Ever Thought Possible on Less Land Than You Can Imagine, by John Jeavons, now in its eighth edition, and in seven languages, including braille.

Double digging with spade and fork loosens the soil, to increase drainage and aeration.

- In double digging, a 12-inch (305 mm) deep trench is dug across the width of the bed with a flat spade, and the soil from that first trench is set aside. The 12 inches (305 mm) below the trench are loosened with a spading fork. When the next trench is dug, that soil is dropped into the empty space of the first trench, and the lower layer is again loosened with a spading fork. This process is repeated along the full length of the bed. The final trench is filled with the soil that was removed from the first trench. The result is a bed that has been tilled to a depth of 24 inches (610 mm). When an entire bed has been double dug, the soil will have greater drainage and aeration, which allows the roots to grow much deeper and reach more nutrients. Despite the fact that no soil has been added, the bed is raised due to the aeration. It is worth noting that hard, unworked soil should be double dug each season until the soil has attained good structure and long lasting aeration. During subsequent seasons, it can be surface cultivated 2 to 4 inches (5 to 10 cm) deep with a hula hoe until compaction again becomes apparent. After double digging the first season, deep tilling during subsequent seasons can be quickly accomplished with a u-bar, particularly in the cases of larger minifarms or commercial farms.
- Composting allows the plants to transform and enrich the soil with organic matter, and also to return nutrients to the soil. Biointensive composting is fairly straightforward, emphasizing the health and diversity of the microbes that break down and become a part of the compost. Thus, relatively cooler composting is practiced, and plant materials are preferred over animal materials. Soil is often combined with the compost to inoculate the pile with microbes. Without human waste recycling, however, nutrients and organic matter are constantly removed from the soil (as food that is consumed by the farmer) and flushed away. Therefore, when safe and legal human waste recycling is possible—as in many places it already is—that fertility can, and should, be returned to the soil. Another great unappreciated source of compost and soil improvement is the roots of crops themselves, which, in the biointensive system are left to decompose in the soil, where they help to both fertilize and “sew it together”, creating stable soil structure. Thus, crops such as alfalfa, which has exceptionally deep roots, and cereal rye, which has a particularly high volume of roots, are valued.
- The soil air from the development of deep soil structure, combined with the microbe- and nutrient-rich compost allow the crops to be planted intensively. To plant intensively, beds are 4 to 6 feet (1.2 to 1.8 m) wide, usually 5 ft (1.5 m) and at least 5 feet (1.5 m) long, often 20 feet (6 m), forming a bed of 100 square feet (10 m^{2}). Crops are not planted in traditional rows according to a square pattern, but are planted in a hexagonal or triangular pattern in the bed so that no space is left unnecessarily unused. These wide beds and close spacings not only allow more plants per area (up to 4 times as many), but also enable the plants to form a living mulch over the soil, keeping in moisture and shading out weeds. Additionally, whenever possible seedlings are started in flats or nursery beds, so that more garden space is available to large plants and so that the seedlings can be more closely spaced before transplant, forming a living mulch in the flat as well.
- Companion planting is described as taking place both in space, which is traditionally called companion planting, and in time, which is traditionally called crop rotation. Companion planting can be used to improve the health and growth of crops, and also as another form of intensive planting, which uses vertical space more efficiently by mixing shallow rooting plants with deep rooting plants or slow growing plants with fast growing plants.
- In order to achieve sustainable fertility on a closed system basis, the biointensive method uses carbon and calorie farming, an aikido-style of work (using the least amount of energy or effort to achieve the greatest amount of work or production), composting—including safe and legal human waste recycling—the use of open pollinated seeds, and limited land use, which allows farmers and gardeners to retain more of the land in a wild state for genetic diversity and an ecosystem balance.
- If carbon or compost crops are grown in about sixty percent of the cultivated land, they can provide the compost materials that maintain the fertility for one hundred percent of the cultivated land. Many cereal crops qualify as compost crops, but provide both food and abundant compost. Some of the compost crops may be grown during the winter, when the land would be otherwise unused. Certain compost crops are higher in carbon while others are higher in nitrogen and/or fix nitrogen in the soil, and the desired proportion of each must be grown for the compost to achieve maximum effectiveness. Also, certain compost crops take particular desired nutrients from the subsoil and concentrate them in the compost, thus allowing a redistribution of those nutrients to the food crops. This proportion of 60% compost crops is crucial to the sustainability that is the goal of the biointensive method, and to the fertility of the garden.
- In calorie farming, care is given to growing enough food energy (and other nutrients) to live on in a minimal area. Root crops are often used in calorie farming because they allow biointensive farmers and gardeners to grow more nutrients in smaller areas, resulting in less labor per calorie, and more space for wilderness and other people. These crops—which have both a high calorie content per pound, and a high yield per area—include potatoes, sweet potatoes, garlic, leeks, burdock, Jerusalem artichoke and parsnips. These crops can produce as much as 5 to 20 times the calories per unit of area per unit of time. In biointensive farming, 30% of the land cultivated for food is used for root crops.
- The use of open pollinated seeds ensures genetic diversity, and allows the farmer to be self-sufficient, harvesting seeds from his or her own plants, and cultivating varieties which are best suited to that particular region.
- The Whole System: biointensive experts emphasize that because these techniques can result in intense productivity and high yields, the system must be practiced as a whole in order to prevent rapid soil exhaustion. The goal of the biointensive method is sustainability, but if the techniques concerning productivity are practiced without integrating the techniques concerning sustainable soil fertility, the soil may be depleted even more rapidly than with conventional farming methods. The most important element for building and maintaining sustainable soil fertility is the growing of 60% compost crops, proper composting techniques that incorporate the right balance of mature carbonaceous brown and green nitrogenous compost materials, and when possible, safe and legal human waste recycling.

== Animals ==
The biointensive method typically concentrates on the vegan diet. This does not mean that biointensive farming must exclude the raising of animals. Animals, while not considered by biointensive practitioners to be sustainable, can be incorporated into biointensive systems, although they increase the amount of land and labor required considerably. The following is excerpted from an article on the topic of integrating animals into a biointensive system from the “Frequently Asked Questions” page on Ecology Action's website:

Livestock can fit into a [biointensive] system, but it usually takes a larger area [than growing a vegan diet]. Normally it takes about 40,000 sq ft of grazing land for 1 cow/steer (for milk/meat) or 2 goats (for milk/meat/wool), or 2 sheep (for milk/meat/wool). [In contrast] With [biointensive farming] and maximizing the edible calorie output in your vegan diet design, one person’s complete balanced diet can be grown on about 4,000 sq ft—a much smaller area.

The challenge [to growing animals for food] is that by 2014, 90% of the world’s people will only have access to about 4,500 sq ft of farmable land per person, if they leave an equal area in a wild state to protect plant and animal genetic diversity and the world’s ecosystems! As you will see from the information that follows on the land requirements for incorporating livestock, this becomes a challenge.

The article goes on to estimate the square footage required to grow fodder for various animals (and compost to replenish the soil), and provides a discussion on whether animal manure should be used as a fertilizer/compost supplement.

== Promotion ==
- In 2010, the UNCCD (United Nations Convention to Combat Desertification) posted an article detailing the benefits of biointensive agriculture, Grow Biointensive System, a tool to fight against desertification.

== See also ==
- Biodynamic agriculture
- Jean-Martin Fortier
- Biointensive Agriculture in Fouta Djallon
- Organic farming
- Permaculture
- Regenerative agriculture
- Southside Community Land Trust – city farm in located in Providence, Rhode Island, which uses the biointensive method.
- Sustainable agriculture
- Sustainable intensive agriculture
