= Broadfork =

Gardening tool

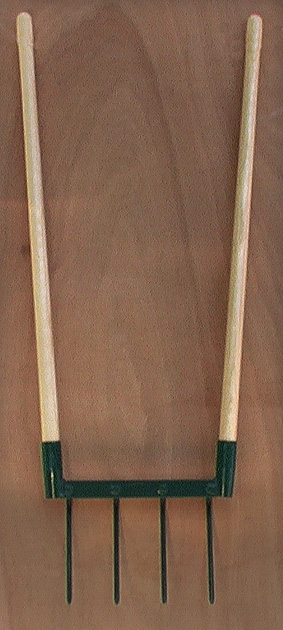
A broadfork

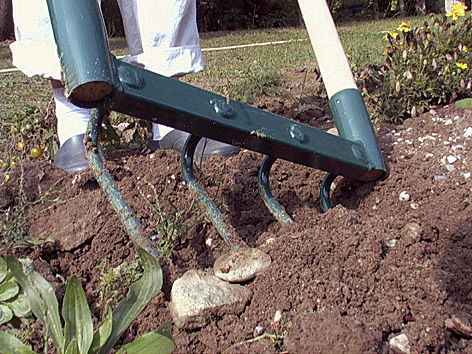
A broadfork being levered

The broadfork, also called a U-fork or grelinette, is a garden tool used to manually break up densely packed soil, including hardpan, to improve soil aeration and drainage. Broadforks are used as part of a no-till or reduced-till seedbed preparation process because they preserve the soil structure and avoid the resurfacing of weed seeds.

== Appearance and use ==
It consists of five or so metal tines, approximately eight inches long, spaced a few inches apart on a horizontal bar, with two handles extending upwards to chest or shoulder level that form a large U-shape.

The operator steps up on the crossbar, using full bodyweight to drive the tines into the ground, then steps backward while pulling backwards on the handles, causing the tines to lever upwards through the soil. This action leaves the soil layers intact, rather than inverting or mixing them, preserving the topsoil structure.

A broadfork can be used in a garden, or practically for one to two acres (4,000 to 8,000 m^{2}). For larger areas, a tractor- or animal-powered chisel plow or similar tool is usually employed.

== U-bar ==
A u-bar is similar to a broadfork but has longer tines - up to 18 inches (46 cm) - for deeper cultivation, since it is meant to be used in beds that have already been double dug at least once. A u-bar also has "elbows" that allow the tines to be raised above soil level when the handles are tilted all the way back. Thus, clumps of soil that get caught on the tines can be broken up by shaking the handles up and down, rocking the tool on its elbows.

Whereas double digging a one hundred square foot (9.3 square meter) bed can take several hours, tilling the same bed with a u-bar can often be done in a half hour or so.

== See also ==
- Garden fork
- Claypan
- Hardpan
- Soil
- Jean-Martin Fortier: farmer/author who promotes use of the broadfork
