= Petrocalcic horizon =

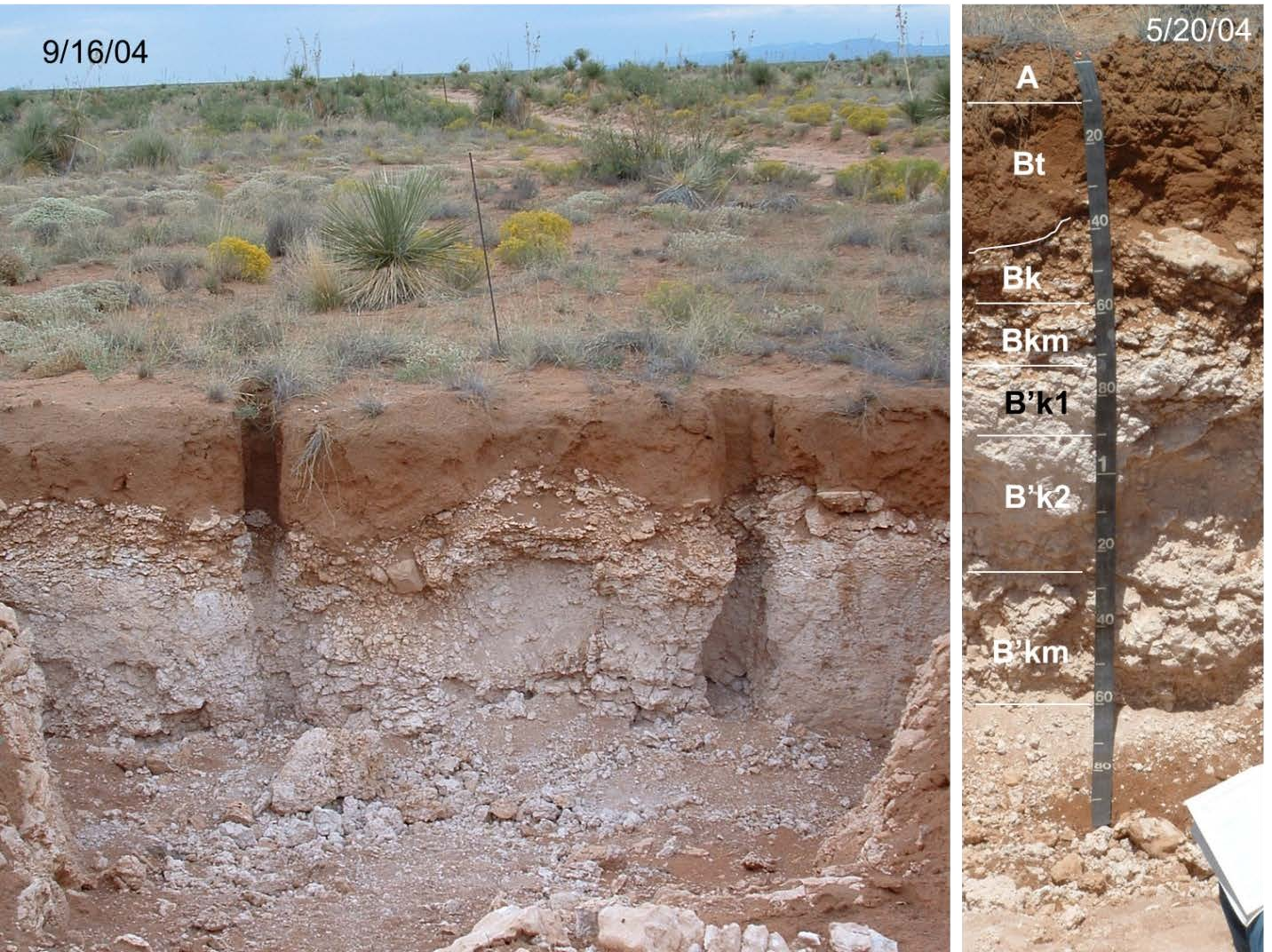
Example of a petrocalcic soil horizon in Southern New Mexico, USA. Horizons with the suffix "m" are petrocalcic

A petrocalcic horizon is a diagnostic horizon in the USDA soil taxonomy (ST) and in the World Reference Base for Soil Resources (WRB). They are formed when secondary calcium carbonate or other carbonates accumulate in the subsoil to the extent that the soil becomes cemented into a hardpan. Petrocalcic horizons are similar to a duripan (ST – WRB: petroduric horizon) and a petrogypsic horizon (WRB) in how they affect land-use limitations. They can occur in conjunction with duripans where the conditions are right and there are enough free carbonates in the soil. Calcium carbonates are found in alkaline soils, which are typical of arid and semiarid climates. A common field test for the presence of carbonates is application of hydrochloric acid to the soil, which indicates by fizzing and bubbling the presence of calcium carbonates.

== Characteristics ==
The required characteristics of a petrocalcic horizon according to the Keys to USDA soil taxonomy, twelfth edition, 2014, are:

1. The horizon is cemented or indurated by carbonates, with or without silica or other cementing agents; and
2. Because of lateral continuity, roots can penetrate only along vertical fractures with a horizontal spacing of 10 cm or more; and
3. The horizon has a thickness of:
  - 10 cm or more or
  - 1 cm or more if it consists of a laminar cap directly underlain by bedrock.

== Genesis ==
Petrocalcic horizons are typically found in older soils and are considered a mark of advanced soil evolution. Most petrocalcic formed before the Holocene age. They form in soil parent material that contains calcium carbonate or receive regular inputs of carbonates through dust. Carbonates are transported into the subsoil by water that precipitates the carbonates in the subsoil upon evaporation, eventually forming a massive, continuous layer of cemented carbonates. There is also some evidence that petrocalcic horizons can form "in situ" by alteration of limestone parent materials and alternating dissolution/precipitation of calcium carbonates.

== See also ==
- USDA soil taxonomy
- World Reference Base for Soil Resources
- Duripan
- Fragipan
- Hardpan
