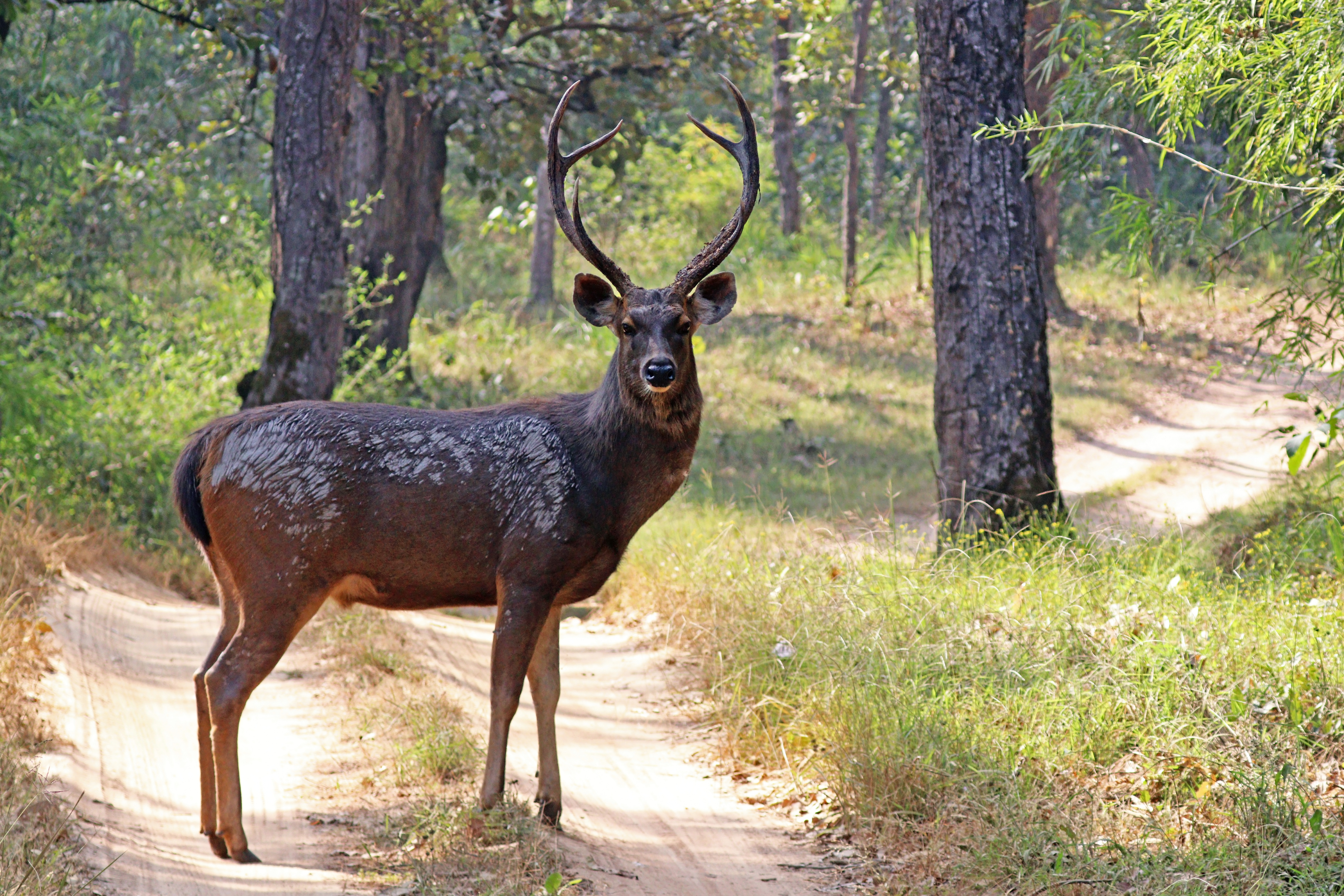
- Stag
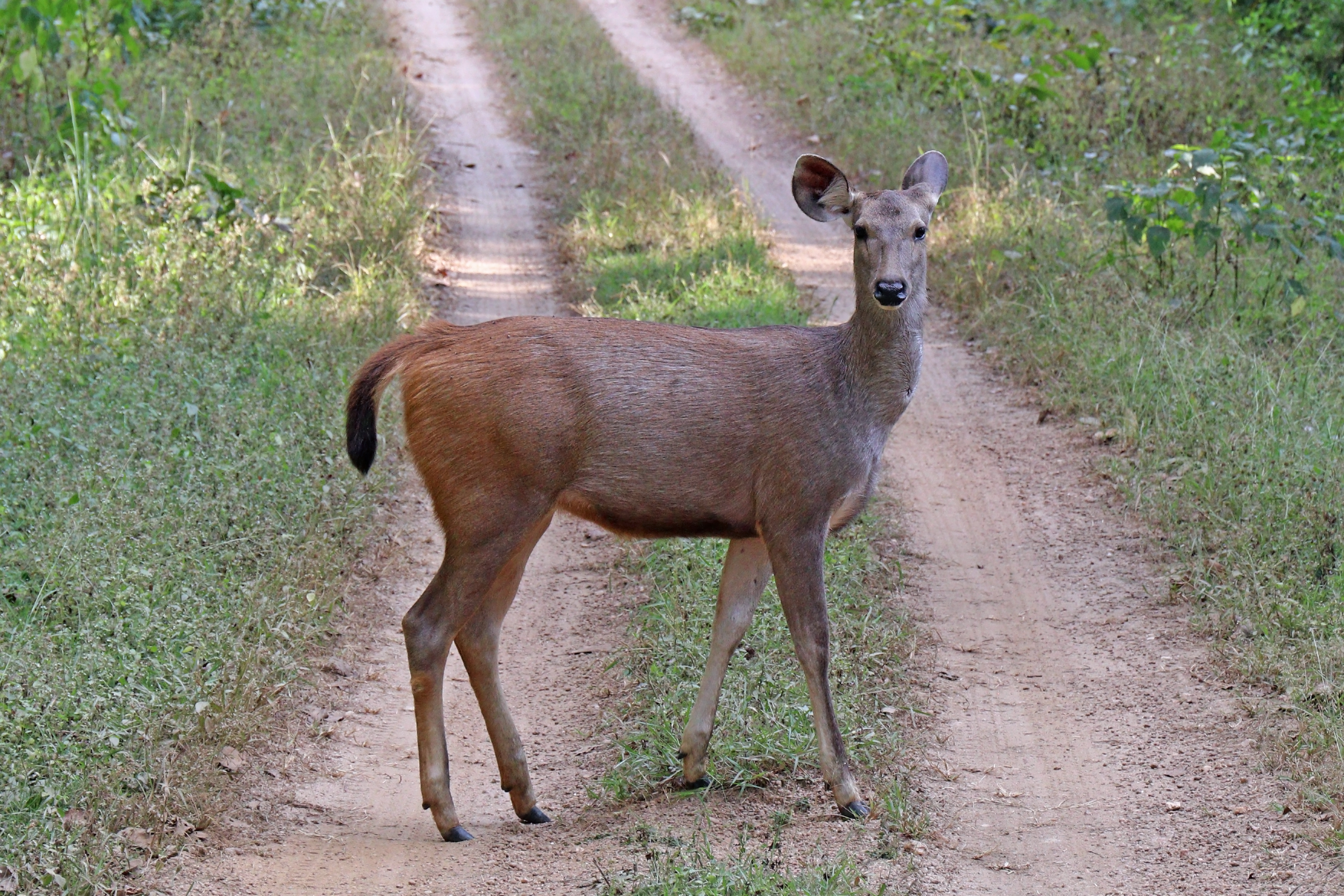
- Sambar in Kanha National Park

Conservation status
- Vulnerable (IUCN 3.1)

Scientific classification
- Kingdom: Animalia
- Phylum: Chordata
- Class: Mammalia
- Order: Artiodactyla
- Family: Cervidae
- Genus: Rusa
- Species: R. unicolor

Binomial name
- Rusa unicolor (Kerr, 1792)
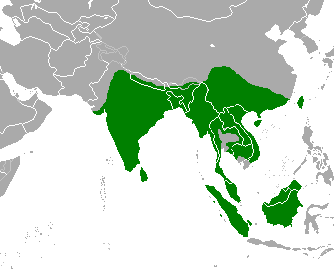
- Range of the sambar

Synonyms
- Cervus unicolor

= Sambar deer =

Species of deer

The sambar (Rusa unicolor) is a large deer native to the Indian subcontinent, South China and Southeast Asia. It has been listed as a vulnerable species on the IUCN Red List since 2008, as populations have declined substantially due to hunting, local insurgency, and industrial exploitation of habitat.

== Taxonomy and evolution ==
Genetic analysis shows that the closest living relative of the sambar is most likely the Javan rusa of Indonesia. This is supported by reports that sambar can still interbreed to produce fertile hybrids with this species.

Fossil sambar are known from the early Pleistocene, although they are very similar in form to early deer species from the Pliocene, with less of a resemblance to more modern cervines. The species probably arose in the tropical reaches of southern Asia, and later spread across its current range. Epirusa and Eucladoceros have both been proposed as possible ancestors of the living species and its closest relatives.

=== Subspecies ===
Seven sambar subspecies are recognised:

Subspecies	Common name	Geographic range
R. u. unicolor	Indian or Sri Lankan sambar	India, Bangladesh, Sri Lanka, vagrant in Pakistan
R. u. brookei	Bornean sambar	Borneo
R. u. cambojensis	Mainland Southeast Asian sambar	Mainland Southeast Asia
R. u. dejeani	South China sambar	Southern and southwestern China
R. u. equina	Malayan sambar	Sumatra
R. u. hainana	Hainan sambar	China (Hainan)
R. u. swinhoei	Formosan sambar deer	Taiwan
↑R. u. boninensis	Bonin sambar	Extinct; Japan (Bonin Islands)

== Description ==
The appearance and the size of the sambar vary widely across its range, which has led to considerable taxonomic confusion in the past; over 40 different scientific synonyms have been used for the species. In general, they attain a height of 102 to 160 cm (40 to 63 in) at the shoulder and may weigh as much as 546 kg (1,204 lb), though more typically 100 to 350 kg (220 to 770 lb). Head and body length varies from 1.62 to 2.7 m (5.3 to 8.9 ft), with a 22 to 35 cm (8.7 to 13.8 in) tail. Individuals belonging to western subspecies tend to be larger than those from the east, and females are smaller than males. Among all living cervid species, only the moose and the elk can attain larger sizes.

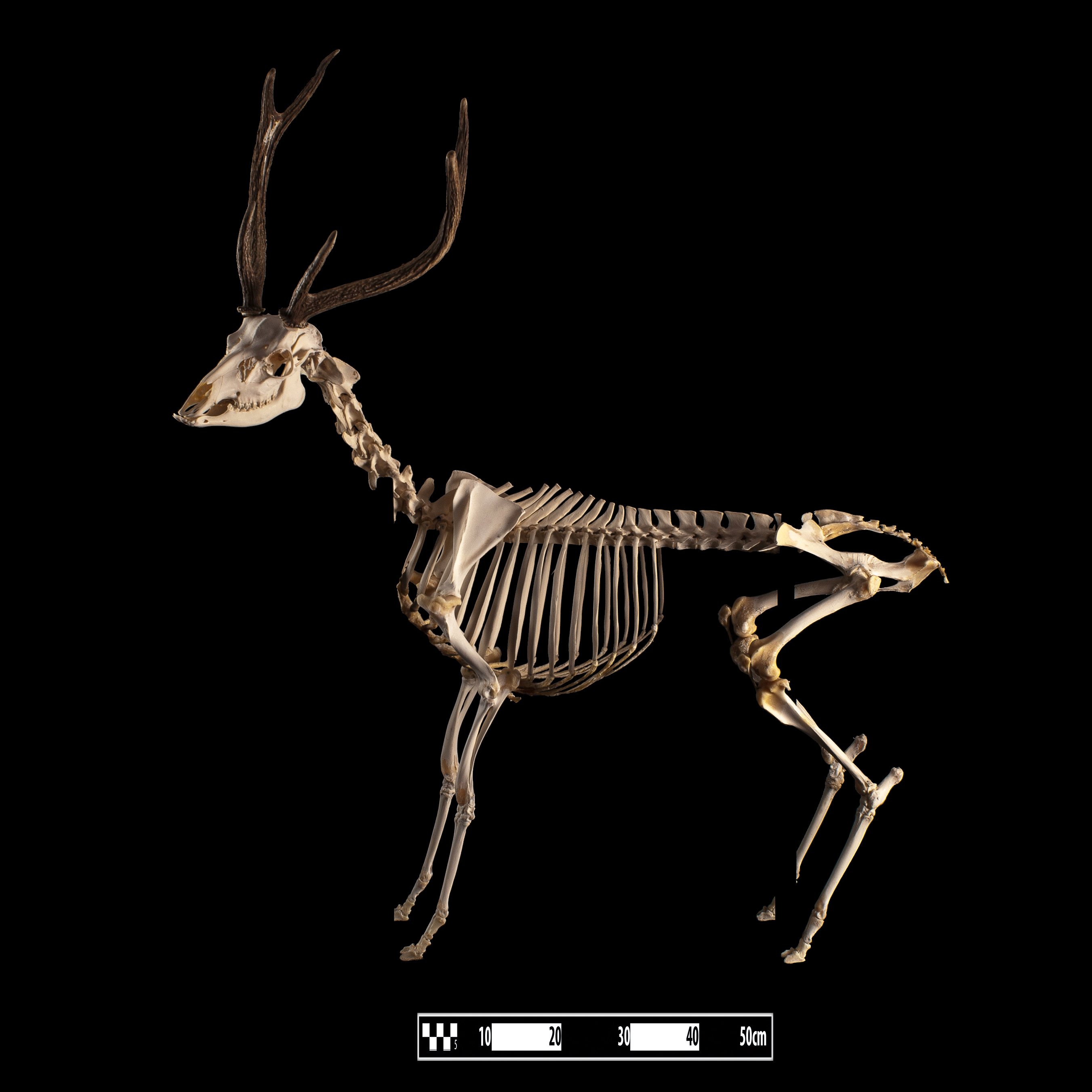
The skeleton displayed at the Museum of Veterinary Anatomy FMVZ USP in São Paulo, Brazil

The large, rugged antlers are typically rusine, the brow tines being simple and the beams forked at the tip, so they have only three tines. The antlers are typically up to 110 cm (43 in) long in fully adult individuals. As with most deer, only the males have antlers.

The shaggy coat can be from yellowish brown to dark grey in colour, and while it is usually uniform in colour, some subspecies have chestnut marks on the rump and underparts. Sambar also have a small but dense mane, which tends to be more prominent in males. The tail is relatively long for deer, and is generally black above with a whitish underside.

Adult males and pregnant or lactating females possess an unusual hairless, blood-red spot located about halfway down the underside of their throats. This sometimes oozes a white liquid, and is apparently glandular in nature.

== Distribution and habitat ==
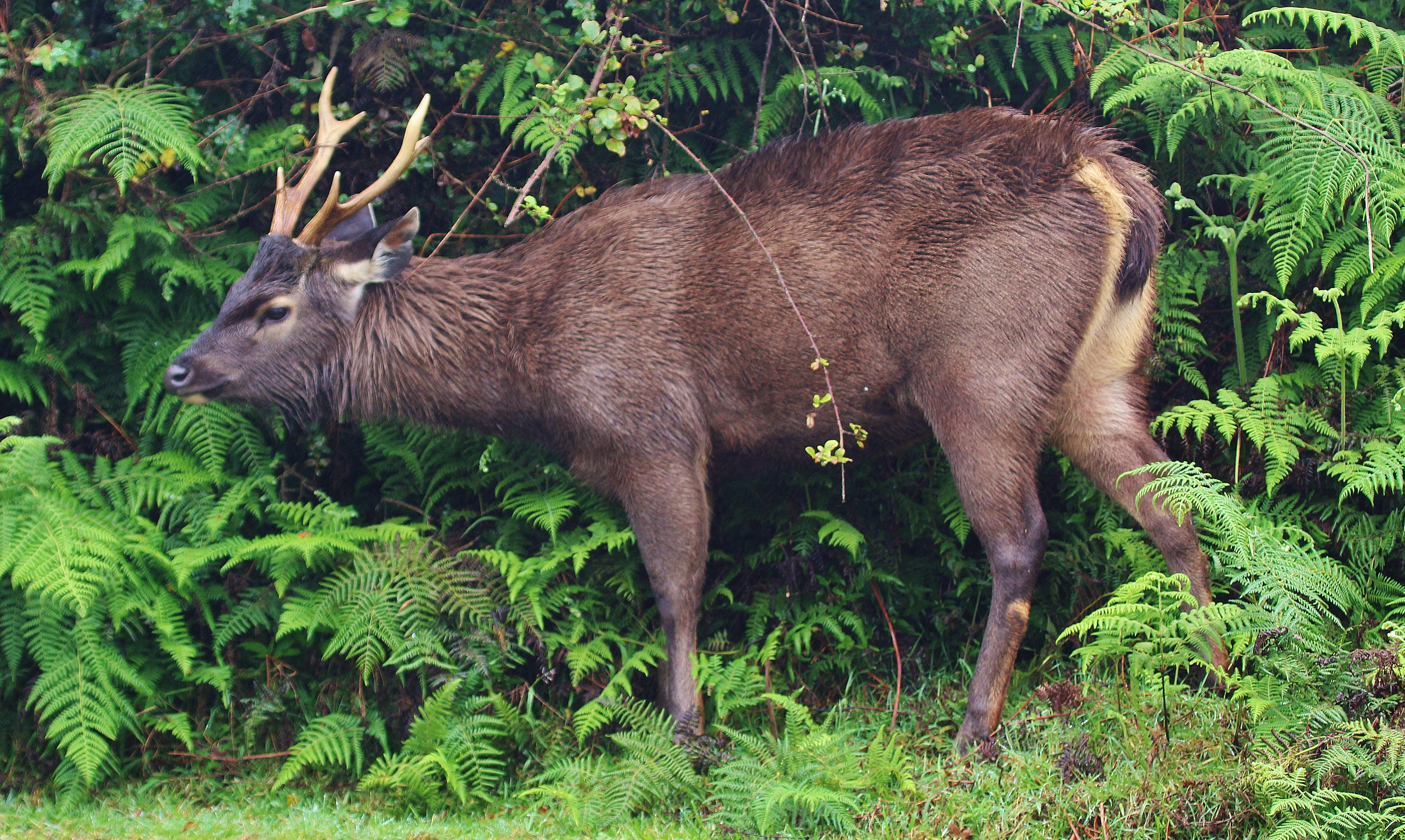
A sambar stag in Horton Plains National Park, Sri Lanka

The sambar is distributed from the south-facing slopes of the Himalayas in Nepal, Bhutan and India to Myanmar, Thailand, Malaysia, Indochina, southern China and in Indonesia on the islands of Sumatra and Borneo. It ranges up to elevations of 3,500 m (11,500 ft) in tropical dry forests, tropical seasonal forests, subtropical mixed forests with stands of conifers and montane grasslands, broadleaved deciduous and broadleaved evergreen trees, to tropical rainforests, and seldom moves far from water sources. It prefers the dense cover of deciduous shrubs and grasses, although the exact nature of this varies enormously with the environment because of its wide Asian range. Home range sizes are probably equally variable, but have been recorded as 1,500 ha (3,700 acres) for males and 300 ha (740 acres) for females in India.

On Sumatra, the sambar is generally more abundant in the lowlands. It is also native to Singapore, but was thought to have been extirpated following World War II due to hunting and deforestation; it was rediscovered in the 1970s near Mandai. Despite the city-state's high level of urbanisation, the sambar population has rebounded and reached about 120 individuals in 2026, an eight-fold increase over the preceding five years.

Individuals sometimes cross the border from India into Pakistan.

== Ecology and behaviour ==
Sambar are nocturnal or crepuscular. The males live alone for much of the year, and the females live in small herds of up to 16 individuals. Indeed, in some areas, the average herd consists of only three or four individuals, typically consisting of an adult female, her most recent young, and perhaps a subordinate, immature female. This is an unusual pattern for deer, which more commonly live in larger groups. They often congregate near water, and are good swimmers.

Sambar feed on a wide variety of vegetation, including grasses, foliage, browse, fruit, and water plants, depending on the local habitat. They also consume a great variety of shrubs and trees. Sambar have been seen congregating in large herds in protected areas such as national parks and reserves in India, Sri Lanka, and Thailand. In Taiwan, sambar along with sika deer, have been raised on farms for their antlers, which they drop annually in April to May and are highly prized for use as knife handles and as grips for handguns.

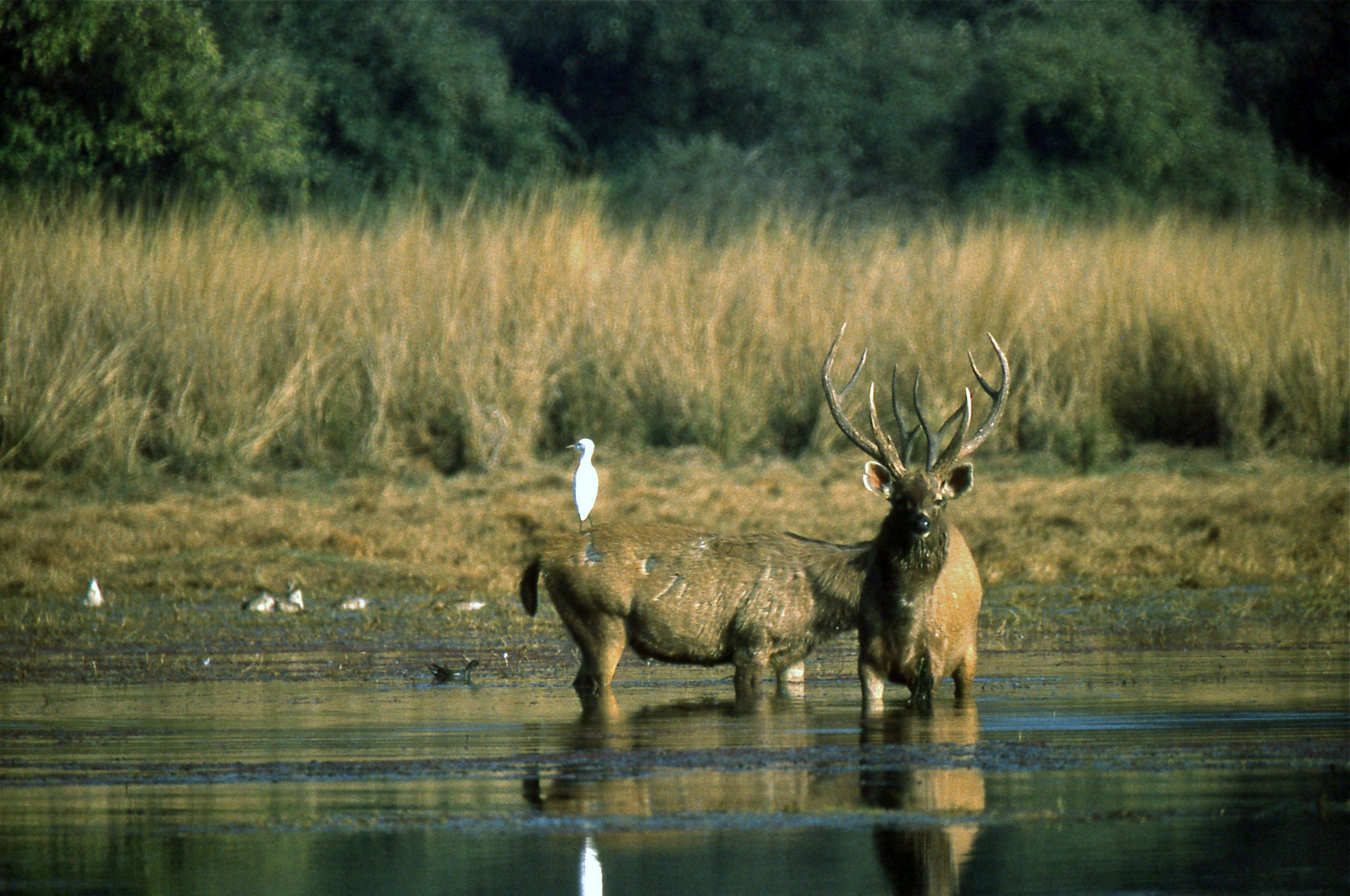
Sambar stags in Ranthambore National Park, India

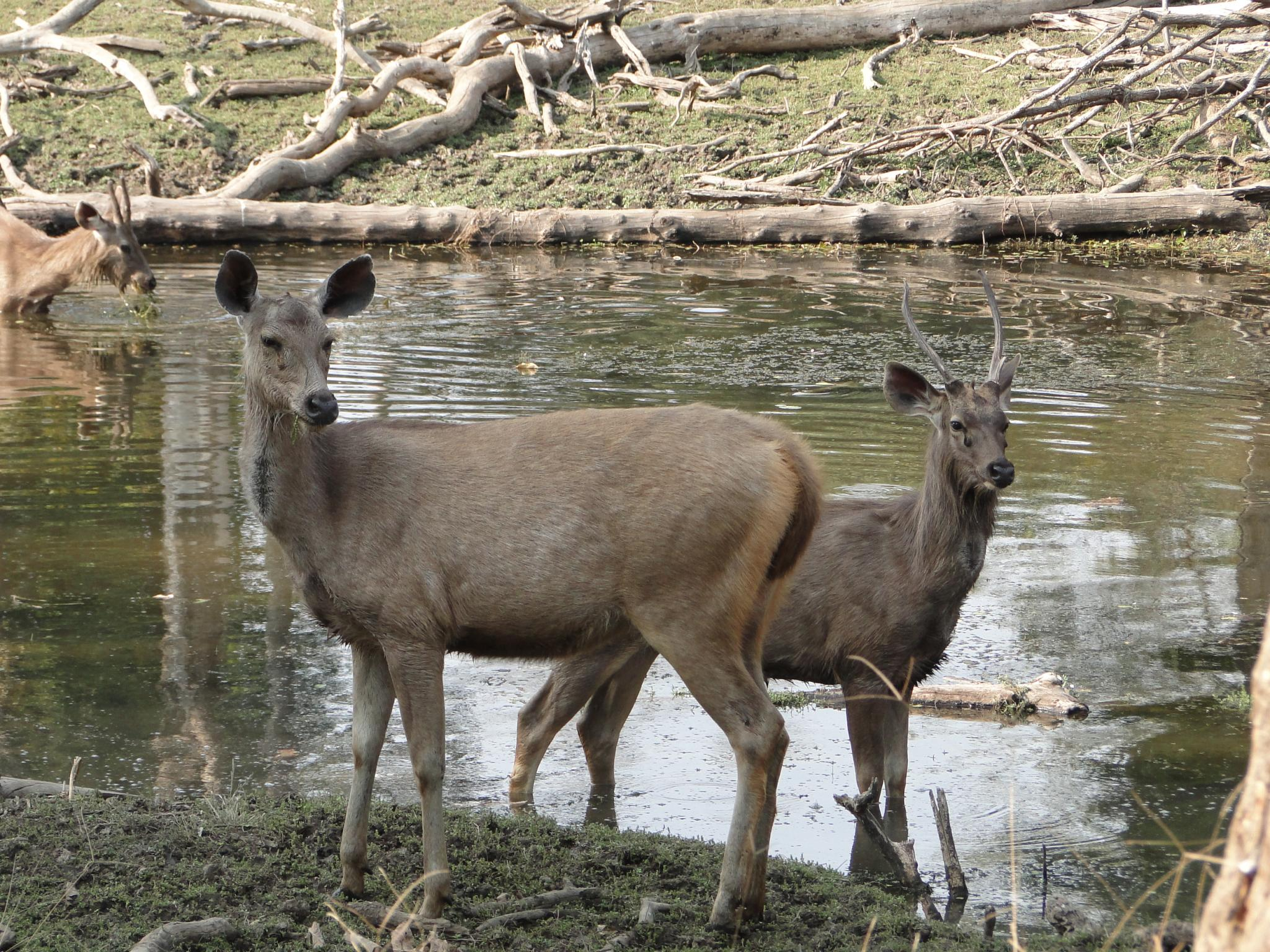
A sambar hind with a young stag

Stags wallow and dig their antlers in urine-soaked soil, and then rub against tree trunks. Sambar are capable of remarkable bipedalism for a deer species, and stags stand and mark tree branches above them with their antlers. A stag also marks himself by spraying urine on his own face with a highly mobile penis. Despite their lack of antlers, female sambar readily defend their young from most predators, which is relatively unusual among deer. When confronted by pack-hunting dholes or feral domestic dogs, a sambar lowers its head with an erect mane and lashes at the dogs. Sambar prefer to attack predators in shallow water. Several sambar may form a defensive formation, touching rumps and vocalising loudly at the dogs. When sensing danger, a sambar stamps its feet and makes a ringing call known as "pooking" or "belling".

The sambar deer is the favourite prey of the Bengal tiger and Asiatic lion. In India, the sambar can comprise up to nearly 45% of the biomass consumed by the Bengal tiger. Anecdotally, the tiger is said to even mimic the call of the sambar to deceive it while hunting. They also can be taken by crocodiles, mostly the sympatric mugger crocodiles and saltwater crocodiles. Leopards and dholes largely prey on only young or sickly deer, though they can attack healthy adults as well.

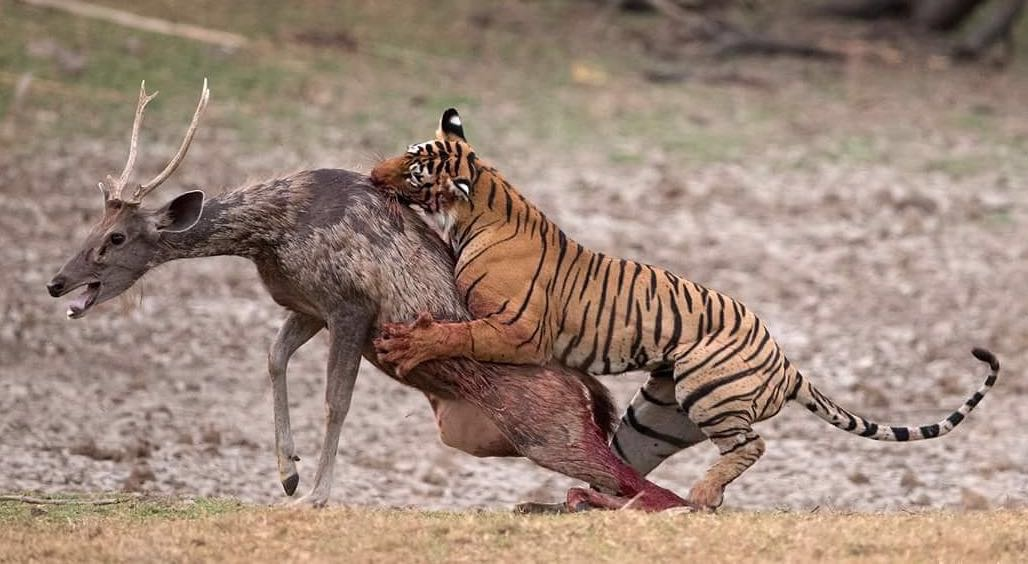
A tiger attacking a sambar in Ranthambore

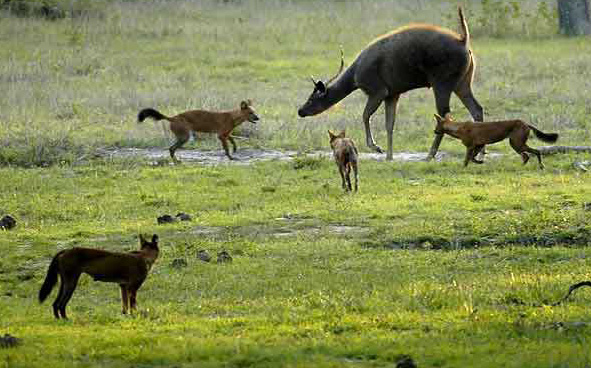
A sambar attacked by dholes, Bandipur National Park

=== Reproduction ===
Though they mate and reproduce year-round, sambar calving peaks seasonally. Oestrus lasts around 18 days. The male establishes a territory from which he attracts nearby females, but he does not establish a harem. The male stomps the ground, creating a bare patch, and often wallows in the mud, perhaps to accentuate the colour of his hair, which is typically darker than that of females. While they have been heard to make a loud, coarse bellow, rutting stags are generally not vocal. Large, dominant stags defend nonexclusive territories surrounded by several smaller males, with which they have bonded and formed alliances through sparring. When sparring with rival males, sambar lock antlers and push, like other deer, but uniquely, they also sometimes rear up and clash downward in a manner similar to species of goat-antelope. Females also fight on their hind legs and use their fore legs to hit each other in the head.

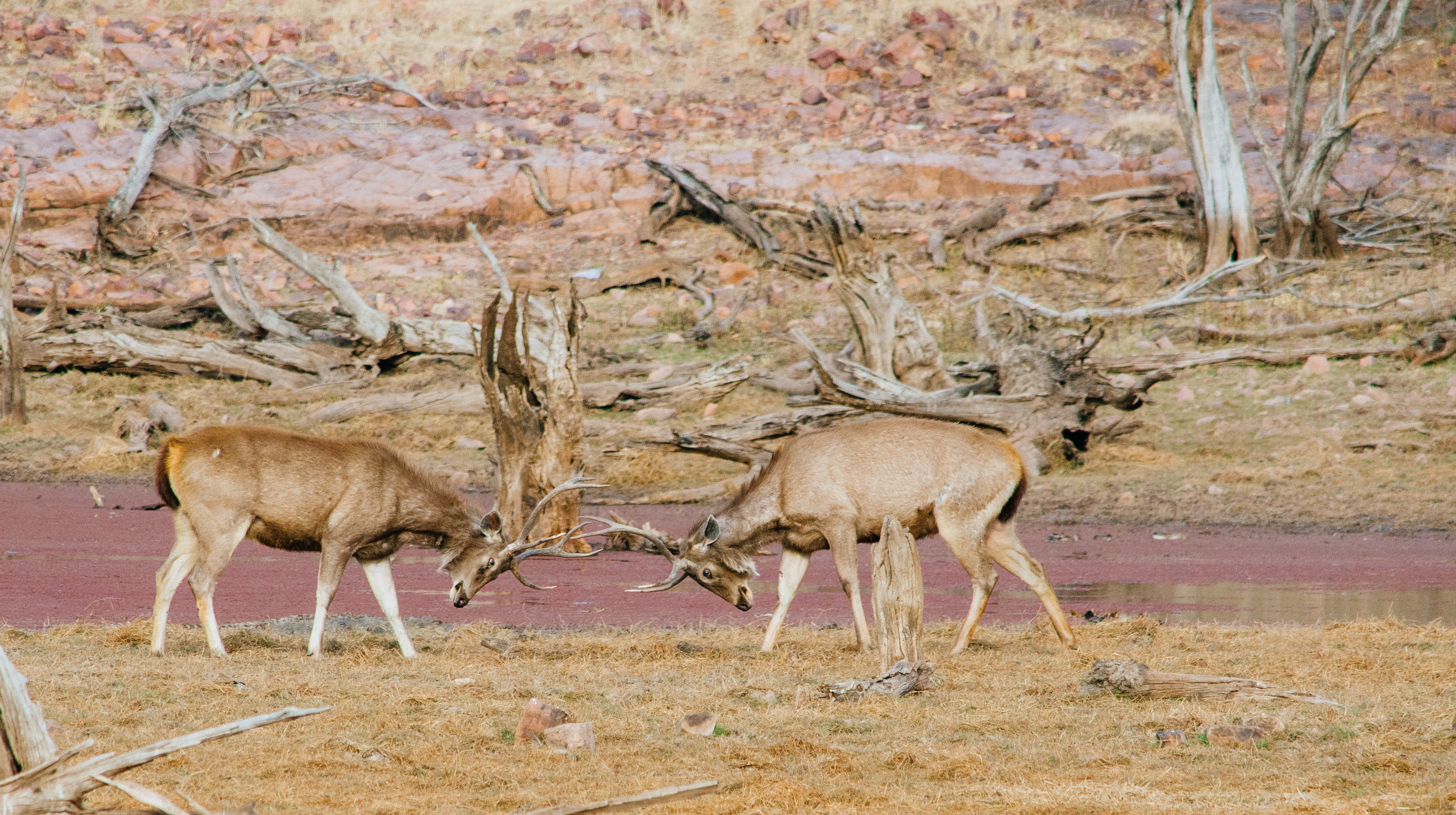
Two samber stags locking antlers

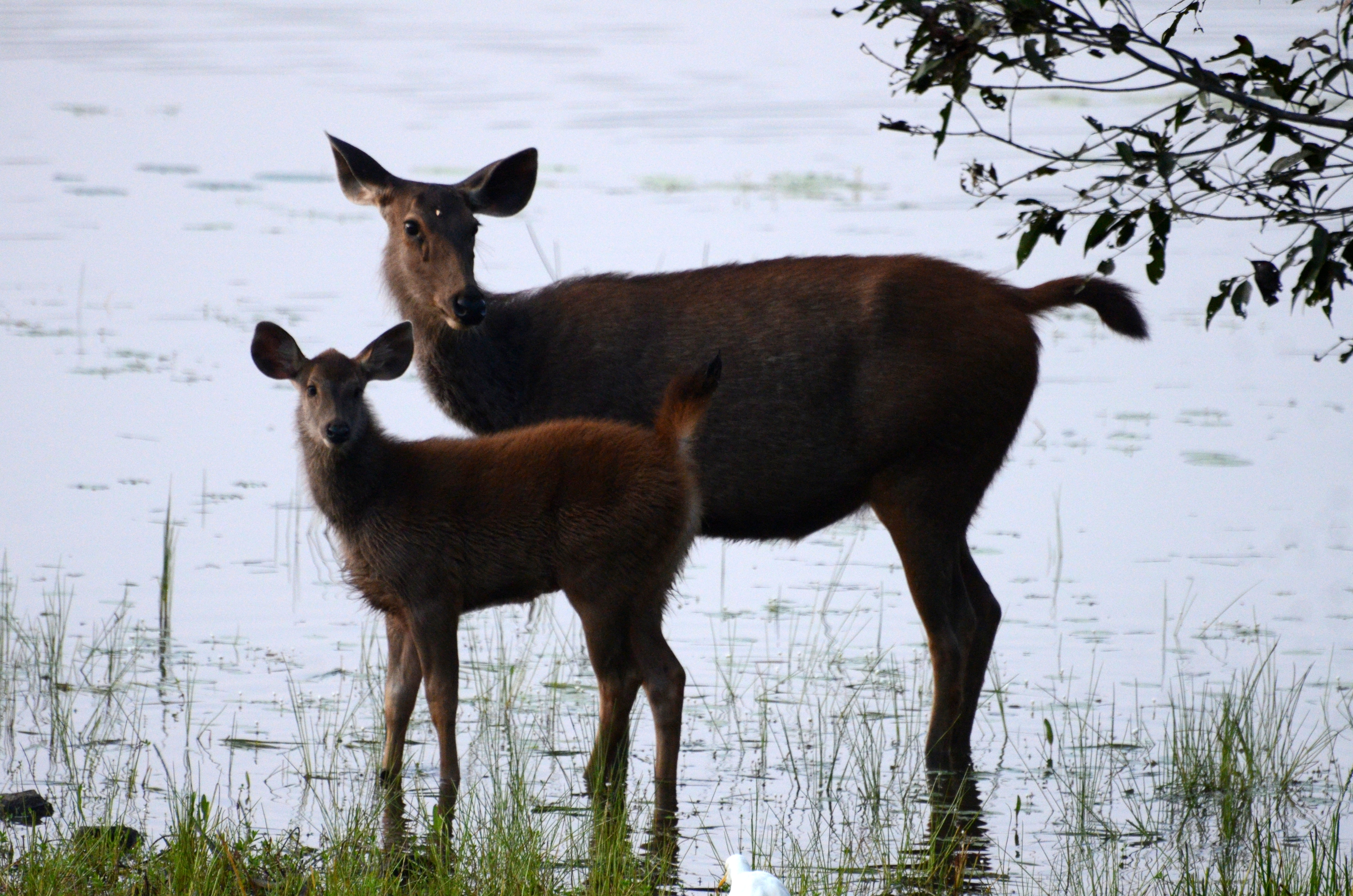
A sambar mother and calf

Courtship is based more on tending bonds rather than males vocally advertising themselves. Females move widely among breeding territories seeking males to court. When mounting, males do not clasp females. The front legs of the male hang loosely, and intromission takes the form of a "copulatory jump".

Gestation probably lasts around 8 months, although some studies suggest it may be slightly longer. Normally, only one calf is born at a time, although twins have been reported in up to 2% of births. Initially weighing 5 to 8 kg (11 to 18 lb), the calves are usually not spotted, although some subspecies have light spots which disappear not long after birth. The young begin to take solid food at 5 to 14 days, and begin to ruminate after one month. Sambar have lived up to 28 years in captivity, although they rarely survive more than 12 years in the wild.

== As an introduced species ==
Sambar have been introduced to various parts of the world, including Australia, New Zealand and the United States.

=== Australia ===
In Australia, hunting sambar is a popular sport. Australian hunting fraternities prize large sambar trophies. Sambar were introduced into Victoria at Mount Sugarloaf in the 1860s, in what is now Kinglake National Park, and at Harewood Estate near Tooradin. They quickly adapted to the Koo-Wee-Rup Swamp and thereafter spread into the high country, where in 2017, numbers were estimated at between 750,000 and one million animals. Later releases were at Ercildoune Estate near Ballarat, Wilsons Promontory, and French Island in Western Port. Another release occurred on the Cobourg Peninsula in the Northern Territory.

In Victoria, sambar are listed as a threat to biodiversity under the Flora and Fauna Guarantee Act 1988 because they reduce the number of native plant species.

Adult male sambar can significantly damage plants, removing most branches on some shrubs and sometimes girdling trees by thrashing their antlers on shrubs and sapling trees. They also feed on seedlings, fruit, or seeds of many plants. They leave scrape marks to advertise their territory.

Considerable debate exists about how they should be managed. Conservation groups believe their environmental effect outweighs their social value. Hunting organisations disagree and want to preserve sambar populations for future generations. Sambar are protected wildlife game species in Victoria and New South Wales, and a game licence is required to hunt them. In Victoria, recent provisions have been made for landowners to control problem deer without having to obtain a Game Licence or Authority to Control Wildlife permit.

In 2008–2009, hunters removed 35,000 sambar from public land in Victoria, many from national parks. This is a small fraction of the 40% of individuals in a sambar population that need to be removed to stop population growth.

=== New Zealand ===
In New Zealand, sambar roam the coast and gullies in Horowhenua District, Manawatū District, Rangitikei, and Whanganui. Until recently, they were protected, but the Department of Conservation has now removed hunting regulations surrounding them, allowing them now to be hunted year round.

=== United States ===
Sambar were introduced onto St. Vincent Island, Florida, in 1908 and increased to about 50 individuals by the 1950s. White-tailed deer also live on St. Vincent Island; however, they inhabit the highlands while the sambar mostly live in the lowlands and marshes. To ensure that the sambar population does not disrupt the native white-tails, hunting permits have been issued since 1987 to regulate the population. Each year, about 130 permits are offered for the three-day hunt. This maintains a sambar population of 70–100 individuals. They do not herd, but occur in groups of four or five animals, possible family groups. Little is known about the sambar's ecology in Florida.

Between 1930 and 1941, Sambar were brought to the US state of Texas along with other imported big game that are referred to as exotic game. 76% of fenced exotics are found on the Edwards Plateau, whereas 59% of free range exotics are found in South Texas.
