= Market garden =

Small consumer-oriented agriculture

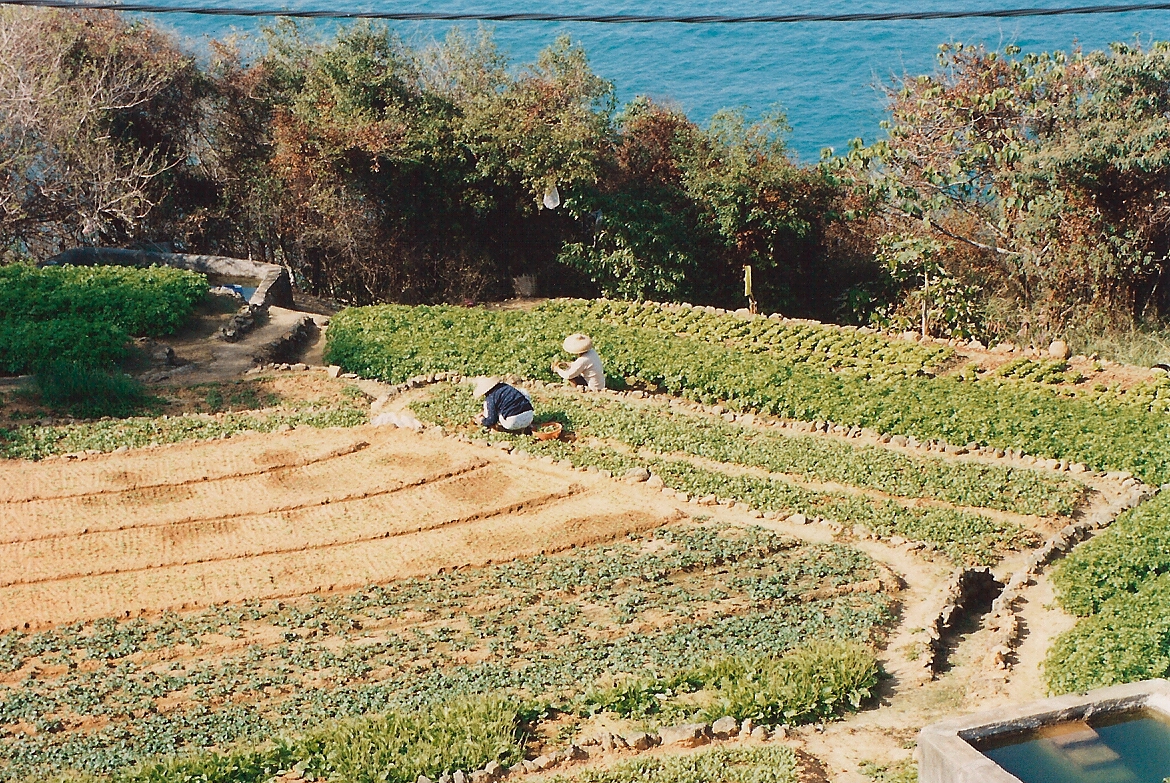
A market garden on an outlying island of Hong Kong

A market garden is a small farm that grows diverse crops such as fruits, vegetables, or flowers, that are sold directly to local consumers or restaurants. The diversity of crops and small size distinguish a market garden from other kinds of farms. In the United States, a market garden is sometimes called a truck farm.

A market garden provides a wide range and steady supply of fresh produce through the local growing season. Unlike large, industrial farms, which practice monoculture and mechanization, many different crops and varieties are grown and more manual labour and gardening techniques are used. The small output requires selling through such local fresh produce outlets as on-farm stands, farmers' markets, community-supported agriculture subscriptions, restaurants and independent produce stores.

== History ==
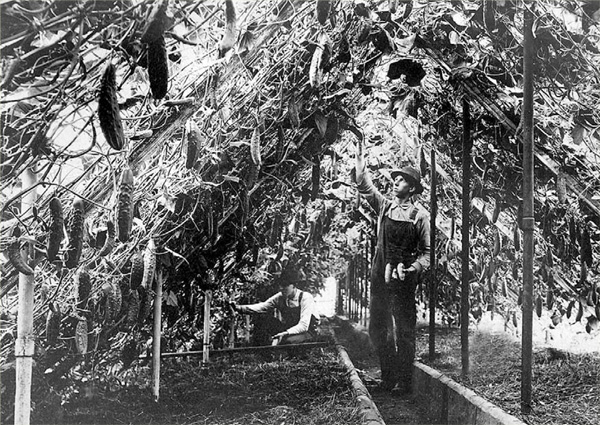
Cucumbers reach to the ceiling in a greenhouse in Richfield, Minnesota, where market gardeners grew a wide variety of produce for sale in Minneapolis. ca. 1910

Traditionally, "market garden" was used to contrast farms devoted to raising vegetables and berries, a specialized type of farming, with the larger branches of grain, dairy, and orchard fruit farming; agricultural historians continue to thus use the term. Such operations were not necessarily small-scale. Indeed, many were very large, commercial farms that were called "gardens" not because of size, but because English-speaking farmers traditionally referred to their vegetable plots as "gardens": in English whether in common parlance or in anthropological or historical scholarship, husbandry done by the hoe is customarily called "gardening" and husbandry done by the plough as "farming" regardless of the scale of either. A "market garden" was simply a vegetable plot, the produce of which the farmer used to sell as opposed to use to feed his or her family. Market gardens are necessarily close to the markets, i.e. cities, that they serve.

Truck farms produce vegetables for market. The word 'truck' in Truck farms does not refer to the transportation truck, which is derived from Greek for "wheel", but rather from the old north French word troquer, which means "barter" or "exchange". The use for vegetables raised for market can be traced back to 1784 and truck farms to 1866.

== Business ==
Selling to the wholesale market usually earns 10–20% of the retail price, but direct-to-consumer selling earns 100%. Although highly variable, a conventional farm may return US$0.03 to US$0.30/m^{2} (US$120 to US$1,210 per acre; US$300 to US$3,000 per hectare) but an efficient market garden can earn in the US$2 to US$5/m^{2} (US$8,100 to US$20,200 per acre; US$20,000 to US$50,000 per hectare) range, or even higher. However, the size of a market garden has a practical upper bound, while with conventional farming, a farmer can farm vast areas because access to a direct market is not a requirement.

Larger market gardens often sell to such local food outlets as supermarkets, food cooperatives, community-supported agriculture programs, farmers' markets, fresh food wholesalers, and any other higher-volume channels that benefit from buying a range of vegetables from a single supplier, their freshness allowing for a premium over the revenue from the supermarkets and frequently other local suppliers. A larger market garden can by mixed crop production maintain a sales alternative to the wholesale channels for consumer products often used by farms that specialize in high volumes of a limited number of crops.

Relying on cities for markets, however, can have drawbacks. For example, in England, south Sussex was famous for growing tomatoes for the London market that were delivered by train. The arrival of railways in the 19th century at first stimulated growth of market gardens in certain areas by providing quick access to the city, but it eventually allowed commuting residents to move there and turn many market garden areas into suburbs. Urban sprawl still eats up farmland in urban regions. Buying the rights to develop farmland from the farmers solved this problem in Suffolk County, New York.

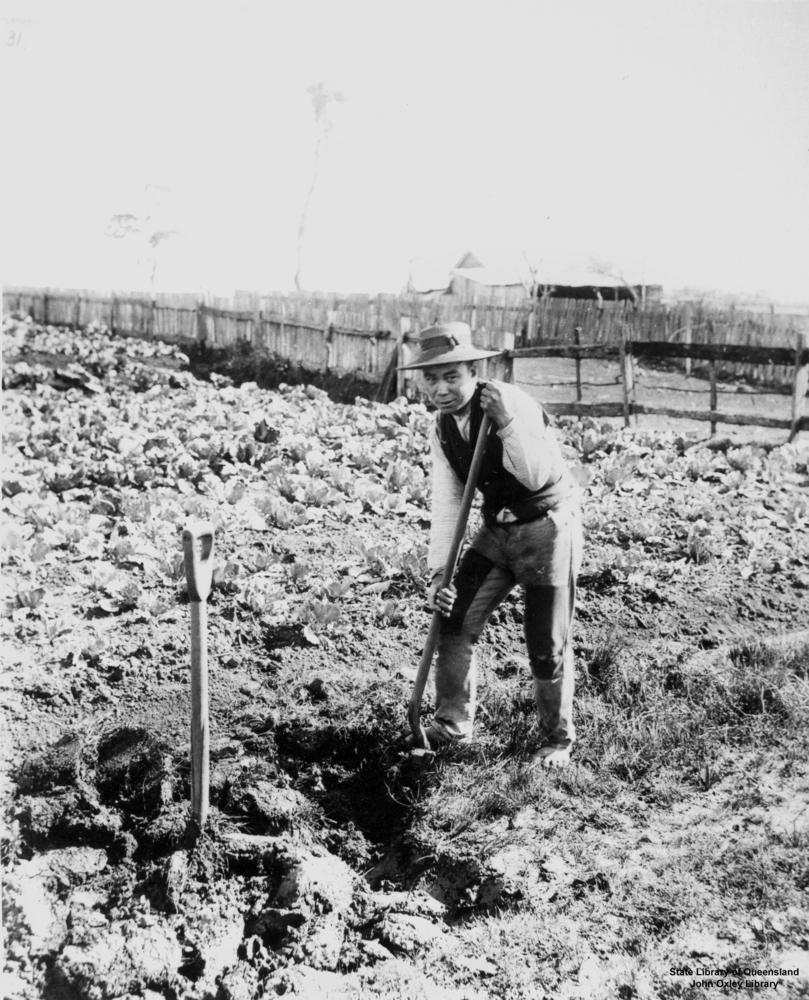
Chinese market gardener in Australia, ca. 1893

== Social role ==
In some more affluent countries, including Australia and the United States, market gardening is rated as a high social utility occupation. It is typically taken up by recent immigrant groups for one or two generations, until they can accumulate capital, language and trade skills. The succession of dominant market garden groups in Australia, for example, was – from the early 19th century Anglo-Celtic, people from German-speaking countries, Chinese (after the peak of the gold rushes in mid-late 19th century), then southern European migrants from Italy, Malta and Yugoslavia (before it disintegrated), then southeast Asian migrant and refugee communities following the Vietnam War, such as the Vietnamese and Cambodians.

Involvement in a market garden lets immigrant groups who otherwise have few marketable skills apart from their labour, become actively involved in the market economy. Benefits are that it does not rely on education or language, it adapts well to providing work for extended family groups, and in large market growing regions even wider community support networks. Sharing of knowledge and experience within communities reduces risks, and supports a network of other trades such as carriers, market agents, and heavy machinery contractors, and contract farm labour. Market-gardening land is typically relatively cheap and allows immigrants to purchase land, often with an accompanying residence, far more readily than in urban settings. However, like all agriculture it risks crop failure, market collapse and competition from industrialized broad-acre farming and 'fresh-frozen' imported produce. Other risks are from hazards such as pesticide use, especially where the market gardeners are not trained in their use or able to read product information. Another consequence is marginalization of the succeeding generation where they are relied upon as the fittest and strongest to succeed in continuing the farm rather than pursue other ambitions and opportunities.

== Alternative lifestyle ==
Market gardening has in recent decades become an alternative business and lifestyle choice for individuals who wish to "return to the land", because the business model and niche allow a smaller start-up investment than conventional commercial farming, and generally offers a viable market (in microeconomics, basic or staple foods are considered as necessities and have highly inelastic demand curves, meaning that consumers will buy them in relatively constant quantities even if prices or incomes vary), especially with the recent popularity of organic and local food. It is in some instances considered hobby farming, although market gardening is a recognized type of farming with a distinct business model that can be significantly profitable and sustainable. There is a spectrum with overlap from with the efforts of amateur gardeners who sometimes sell from home or at markets, as an extension of their pastime, to fully commercial market gardening as the main or sole income stream. The latter requires the most discipline and business sense. Successful practitioners who have written books about it include Eliot Coleman and Jean-Martin Fortier.

== In contemporary North America ==
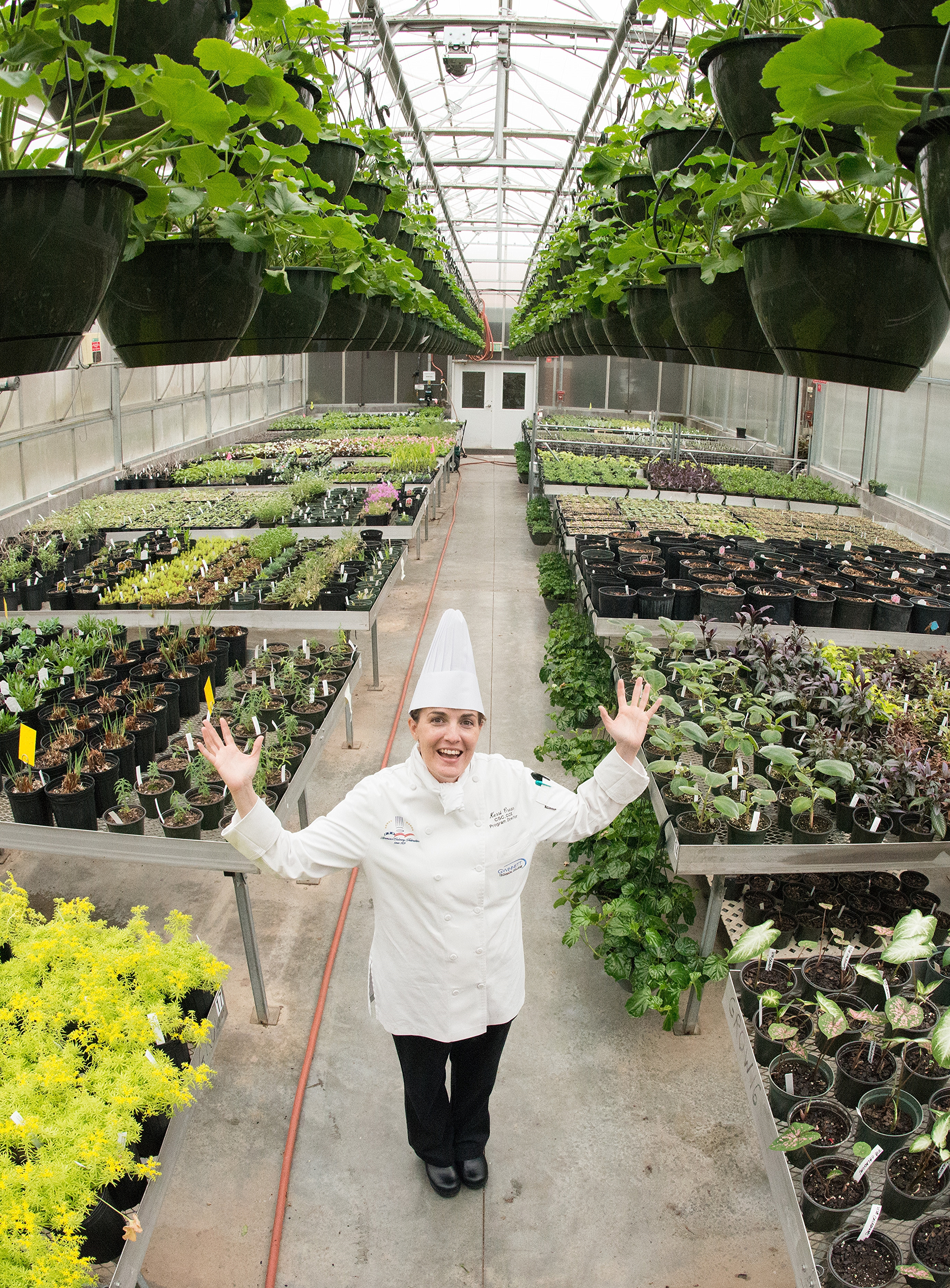
A greenhouse with edible plants for use in a culinary school in Lawrenceville, Georgia, US

Within the United States, market gardens are most popular in densely populated regions on the Eastern Seaboard such as New Jersey, Massachusetts, and Florida. Outside of the United States, they also exist in similar regions in other developed countries, such as those of Northern Europe, New South Wales in Australia, and the Río de la Plata region of South America.

An example of a market garden operation in North America might involve one farmer working full-time on two acres (0.81 ha; 8,100 m^{2}). Most work is done with hand and light power tools, and perhaps a small tractor. Some 20 different crops are planted throughout the season. Hardier plants, like peas, spinach, radish, carrots and lettuce are seeded first, in earlier spring, followed by main season crops, like tomatoes, potatoes, corn, beans, cucumber, onions, and summer squash. A further planting timed for harvest in the cooler fall conditions might include more spinach and carrots, winter squash, cabbage, and rutabaga. Harvesting is done at least weekly, by hand, sometimes with part-time help, and produce is sorted, washed and sold fresh at the local farmers' market, and from an on-farm stand. A pick-up truck is used for short-distance transport of crops and other farm materials. The workflow is a steady cycle of planting and harvesting right through the growing season, and usually comes to an end in the cold winter months.

A somewhat larger market garden operation, ranging from 10 to 100 acres (4.0 to 40.5 ha; 40,000 to 405,000 m^{2}), may be referred to as intensive mixed vegetable production, although the essential business and farming tasks are the same. Such operations are often run by a full-time farmer or farm family, and a few full-time employees. The tractor is relied upon for many tasks, and manual labor requirements, particularly for setting transplants and harvesting, are often significant, with crews of 10, 20, or more people employed seasonally. This has led in the U.S. to groups of "transient" or "migrant" workers who follow the harvest seasons to different farms across the country. In cooler climates, greenhouses are generally used to produce transplants, and sometimes greenhouse production is extended through winter or with hydroponics. Harvest and post-harvest handling are more sophisticated at the larger scale, with some mechanized harvest and processing equipment, walk-in coolers, and refrigerated delivery vehicles.

== Spain and Portugal ==
A huerta (Spanish: [ˈweɾta]) or horta (Catalan: [ˈɔɾta], Portuguese: [ˈɔɾtɐ]), from Latin hortus, "garden", is an irrigated area, or a field within such an area, common in Spain and Portugal, where a variety of vegetables and fruit trees are cultivated for family consumption and sale. Typically, individual plots (huertos) belong to different people; they are located around rivers or other water sources because of the amount of water required, which is usually provided through small canals (acequias). They are a kind of market garden. Elinor Ostrom has defined huertas as "well-demarked irrigation areas surrounding or near towns" (emphasis added).

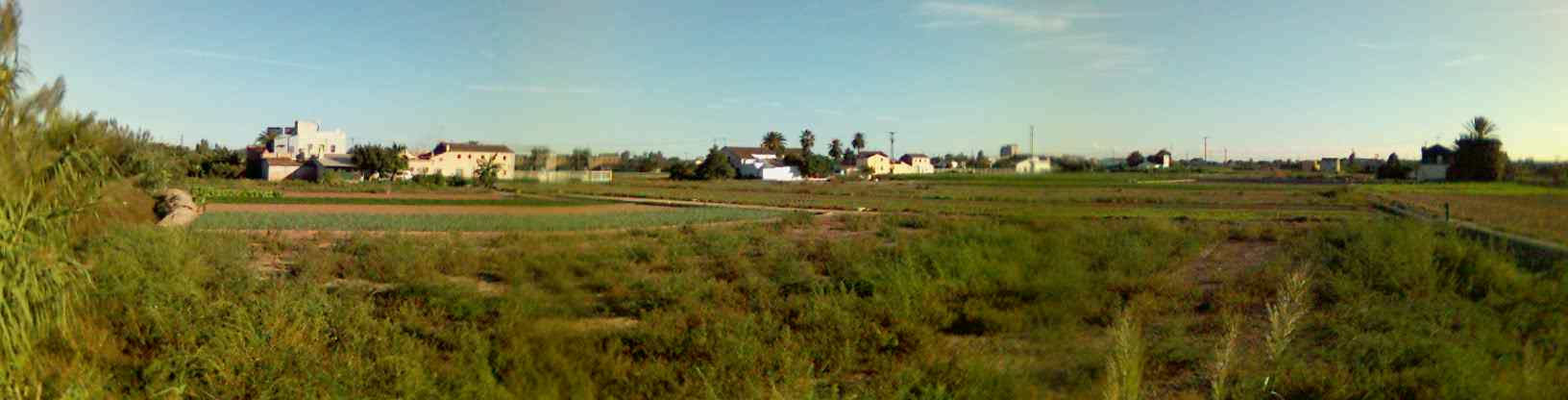
Huerta in Valencia, Spain

== See also ==
- Acequia
- Evesham Custom
- Horta of Valencia
- Orchard
- Irrigation district
- Slow Food
- Urban agriculture
