= Jean-Martin Fortier =

Canadian farmer (born 1978)

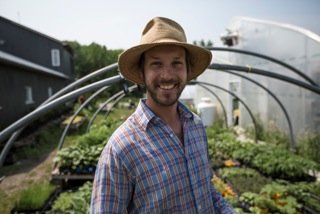
Jean-Martin Fortier at Les Jardins de la Grelinette.

Jean-Martin Fortier (born 1978) is a Québécois farmer, author, educator and advocate for ecological, human-scale, and economically viable sustainable agriculture. In 2004, he and his wife, Maude-Hélène Desroches, created Les Jardins de la Grelinette, a certified organic market garden in Saint-Armand, Quebec. The farm practices biointensive agriculture, focusing on maximum yield from minimum inputs. Fortier detailed his methods in the book, The Market Gardener: A Successful Grower's Handbook for Small-Scale Organic Farming (2013), and in the film, The Market Gardener's Toolkit (2016).

== Biography ==
Fortier met his wife and farming partner while both were studying at McGill University's School of Environment. After graduating in 2001, Fortier and Desroches spent time working on organic farms in the United States and Mexico. They farmed 0.2 acre of rented land before settling on their own farm in Saint-Armand, Quebec in 2004.

In 2012, The Market Gardener, was first published in French, and appeared in 2013, He has published articles about his work in Canadian Organic Grower, La Terre de Chez Nous and Growing for Market. Fortier has worked with the Montreal-based non-profit Équiterre to promote the development of community-supported agriculture (CSA), and with the Vancouver-based Young Agrarians network to promote sustainable agriculture. He serves as a tool and equipment advisor for Johnny's Selected Seeds and Dubois Agrinovation.

== Biointensive farming ==
On Les Jardins de la Grelinette, 1.5 of the farm's 10 acres are kept in biologically intensive production. The farm produces a variety of vegetables, and some herbs and fruits. Produce is sold at the Knowlton and St.-Lambert farmers' markets in Montreal, to restaurants and stores, and through 140 CSA shares. In the farm's fourth season, when sales first topped $100,000, the business won a farming competition prize for its outstanding economic performance. The farm now grosses about $140,000 in sales in a typical year. Fortier and Desroches employ paid staff and host interns. Since 2015, Desroches has been running the farm on her own.

=== Production methods ===
Hand tools and efficient small-scale equipment such as walk-behind tractors are used. With hand tools, rows of crops do not need to be spaced according to the dimensions of a tractor and cultivating implements, allowing for close spacing. Multiple successions of plantings in a year contribute to a high ratio of yield-to-area. Minimizing the growing area needed increases the efficiency of the farm in terms of labor and materials (e.g. irrigation lines, row cover). Additional efficiency is achieved through standardizing the growing areas: the farm consists of 10 plots each containing 16 beds; each bed is 30 inches wide and 100 feet long. A uniform bed size facilitates crop rotation, production planning, and calculation of soil amendments.

=== The Market Gardener ===
The Market Gardener was first published in French in 2012 as Le Jardinier-Maraîcher by Éditions Écosociété. In 2013, an online fundraising campaign to support the English translation was launched small-farming advocacy organization, FarmStart. The book is designed to serve as a practical handbook for small-scale farming, detailing Fortier's production methods and business practices. Fortier promoted both language versions internationally, with the assistance of various young farmer and sustainable agriculture non-profits and projects. The book has been compared with Eliot Coleman's influential 1989 book The New Organic Grower. Coleman, who reviewed the book, has stated, "Jean-Martin's book is very well done and should be of great use to market growers everywhere. Exchange of ideas and information is so important because when we pass ideas on, the next person gets to start where we got to and take the ideas to another level."

=== Ferme des Quatre-Temps ===
In the fall of 2015, Fortier was recruited by André Desmarais of Power Corporation to design and operate a model farm, La Ferme des Quatre-Temps, on a 167-acre property in Hemmingford, Quebec. The project's mission is to demonstrate how diversified small-scale farms, using regenerative and economically efficient agricultural practices, can produce a higher nutritional quality of food and more profitable farms than conventional agriculture. The farm consists of four acres of vegetable production; 60 acres of animal grazing rotation, including beef, pigs and chickens, 10 acres of fruit orchards, a culinary laboratory for processing and creating original products, and a large greenhouse to produce vegetables throughout the year. The principles of permaculture were applied to ensure ecosystem balance: flowers were planted, ponds were dug to accommodate frogs and birdhouses were built to naturally control the proliferation of pests. Bee hives have also been installed on the property to promote pollination and mobile chicken coops allow hens to roam from one pasture to another to feed on the worms in manure from cows.
