= Fragipan =

Type of soil layer

A fragipan is a diagnostic horizon in USDA soil taxonomy. They are altered subsurface soil layers that restrict water flow and root penetration. Fragipans are similar to a duripan in how they affect land-use limitations. In soil descriptions, they are commonly denoted by a Bx or Btx symbol. They often form in loess ground. The first record of fragipans is probably that by John Hardcastle in New Zealand in the 1880s.

== Characteristics ==
The Required Characteristics of a fragipan according to the "Keys to USDA soil taxonomy, tenth edition, 2006" are

1. The layer is 15 cm or more thick; and
2. The layer shows evidence of pedogenesis within the horizon or, at a minimum, on the faces of structural units; and
3. The layer has very coarse prismatic, columnar, or blocky structure of any grade, has weak structure of any size, or is massive. Separations between structural units that allow roots to enter have an average spacing of 10 cm or more on the horizontal dimensions; and
4. Air-dry fragments of the natural soil fabric, 5 to 10 cm in diameter, from more than 50 percent of the layer slake when they are submerged in water; and
5. The layer has, in 60 percent or more of the volume, a firm or firmer rupture-resistance class, a brittle manner of failure at or near field capacity, and virtually no roots; and
6. The layer is not effervescent in dilute HCl.

What this means in plain English is

1. The fragipan has to meet a certain thickness requirement.
2. There needs to be evidence that the fragipan formed from altered parent material, as opposed to being simply undeveloped dense subsoil.
3. The layer cannot have been altered by plant roots, which would result in granular soil structure, and plant roots are unable to penetrate the fragipan except along intermittent cracks.
4. The requirement that a fragipan can slake in water separates it from a petrocalcic horizon and a duripan.
5. Fragipans are very hard, even when thoroughly wet, to the extent that roots cannot penetrate.
6. A fragipan does not contain calcium carbonate or magnesium carbonate, which would make it a petrocalcic horizon.

== Genesis ==
The genesis of fragipans is open to considerable debate. Soil scientists often argue over the definition of fragipans and whether or not fragipans exist in certain landscapes. Their formation can be attributed to compacting of soils by glaciers during the last ice age, physical ripening, permafrost processes, or other events that occurred in the pleistocene age. Some fragipans inherit their properties from buried soils called paleosols. It has been proposed that fragipans form by hydroconsolidation, that is the collapse of the soil structure due to loading and wetting.

== See also ==
- Duripan
- Hardpan
- Petrocalcic horizon
- Petrogypsic horizon
- USDA soil taxonomy
