= Pitchfork =

Agricultural tool

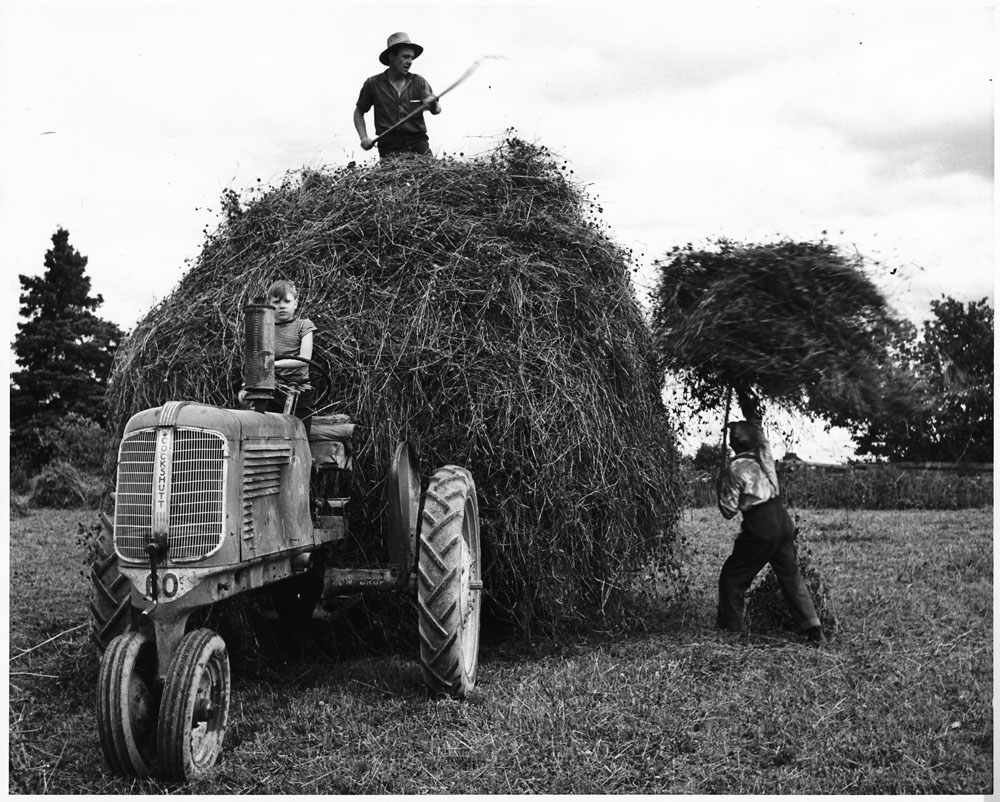
Pitching hay

A pitchfork or hay fork is an agricultural tool used to pitch loose material, such as hay, straw, manure, or leaves. It has a long handle and usually two to five thin tines designed to efficiently move such materials.

The term is also applied colloquially, but inaccurately, to the garden fork. While similar in appearance, the garden fork is shorter and stockier than the pitchfork, with three or four thicker tines intended for turning or loosening the soil of gardens.

== Alternative terms ==
In some parts of England, a pitchfork is known as a prong. In parts of Ireland, the term sprong is used to refer specifically to a four-pronged pitchfork.

== Description ==
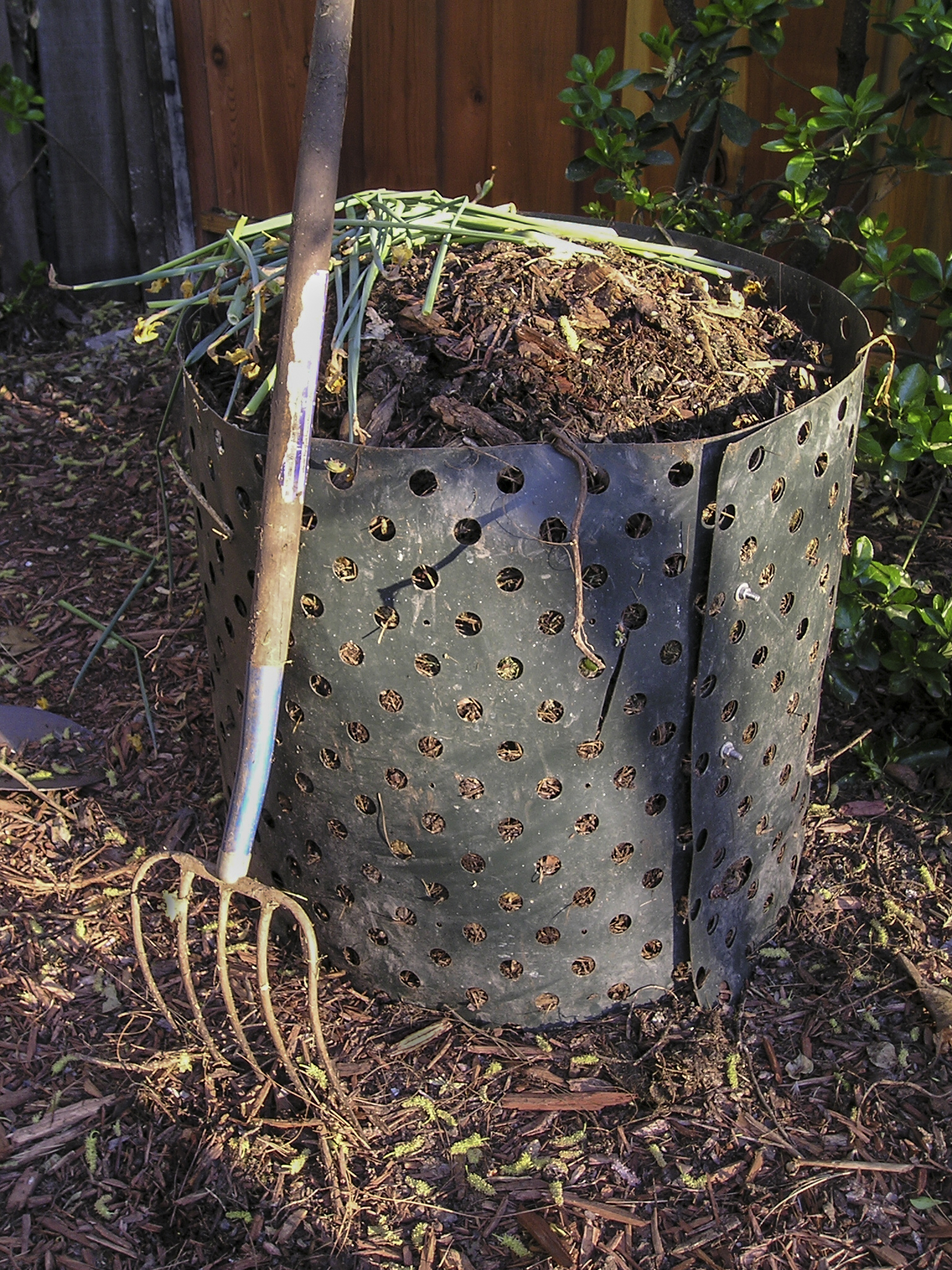
A pitchfork with five tines next to a compost bin. In this configuration, the pitchfork resembles a garden fork.

The typical pitchfork consists of a wooden shaft bearing two to five slightly curved metal tines fixed to one end of a handle. These are typically made of steel, wrought iron, or some other alloy, though historically wood or bamboo were used. Unlike a garden fork, a pitchfork lacks a grab at the end of its handle.

Pitchforks with few tines set far apart are typically used for bulky material such as hay or straw; those with more and more closely spaced are used for looser materials such as silage, manure, leaves, or compost.

== History ==
In Europe, the pitchfork was first used in the Early Middle Ages, at about the same time as the harrow. These were made entirely of wood.

In the Middle Ages, pitchforks might on occasion be employed as an improvised weapon in battle by peasants unable to obtain a proper weapon. The visual idiom of a mob of peasants staging a revolt while armed with just torches and pitchforks is well-known, if not necessarily historical, and seen or parodied in several works.

== In popular culture ==
=== Artwork ===
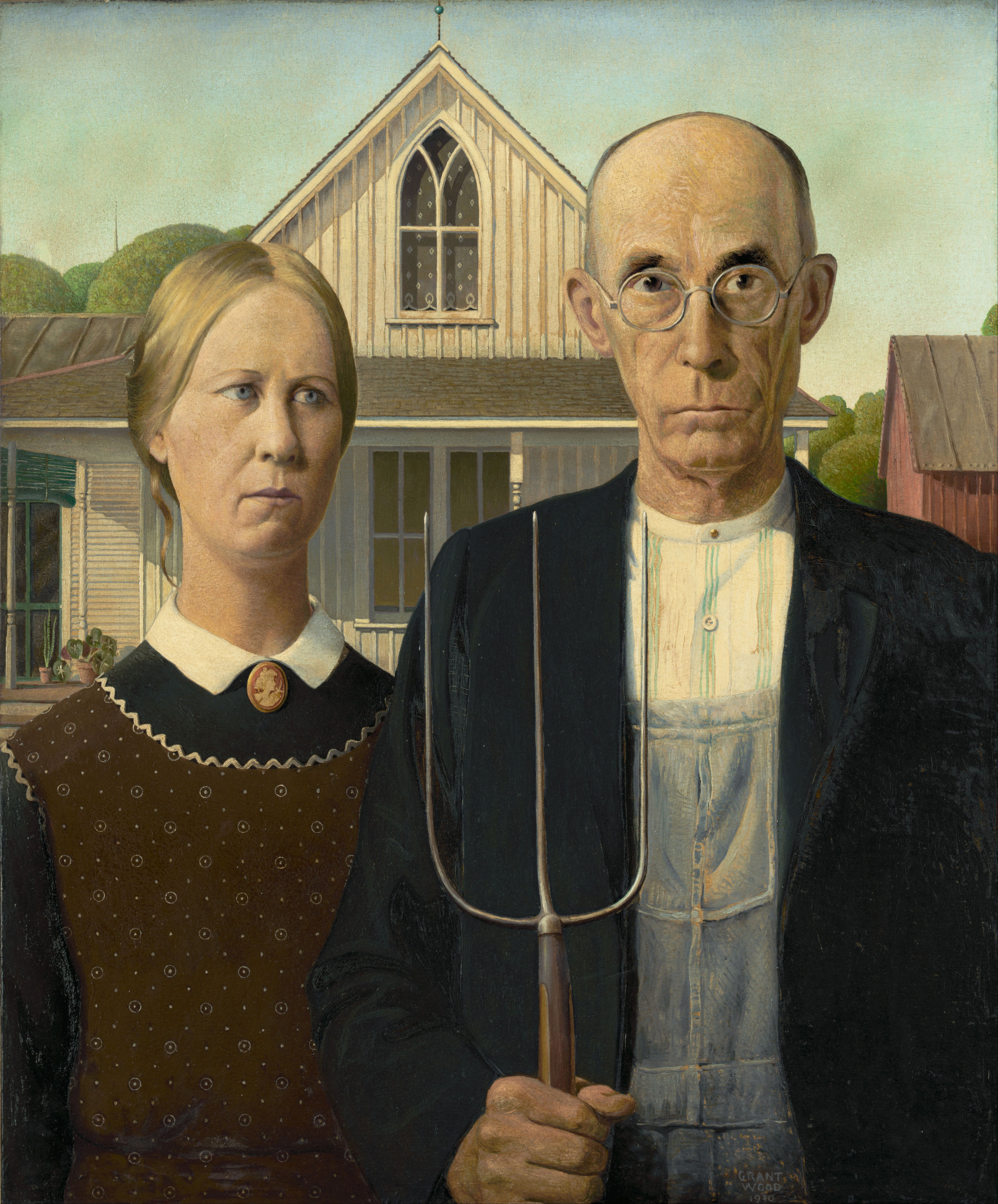
American Gothic, by Grant Wood, 1930

Paintings by various artists depict a wide variety of pitchforks in use and at rest. A notable American work is American Gothic (1930) by Grant Wood, which features a three-pronged tool.

=== Politics ===
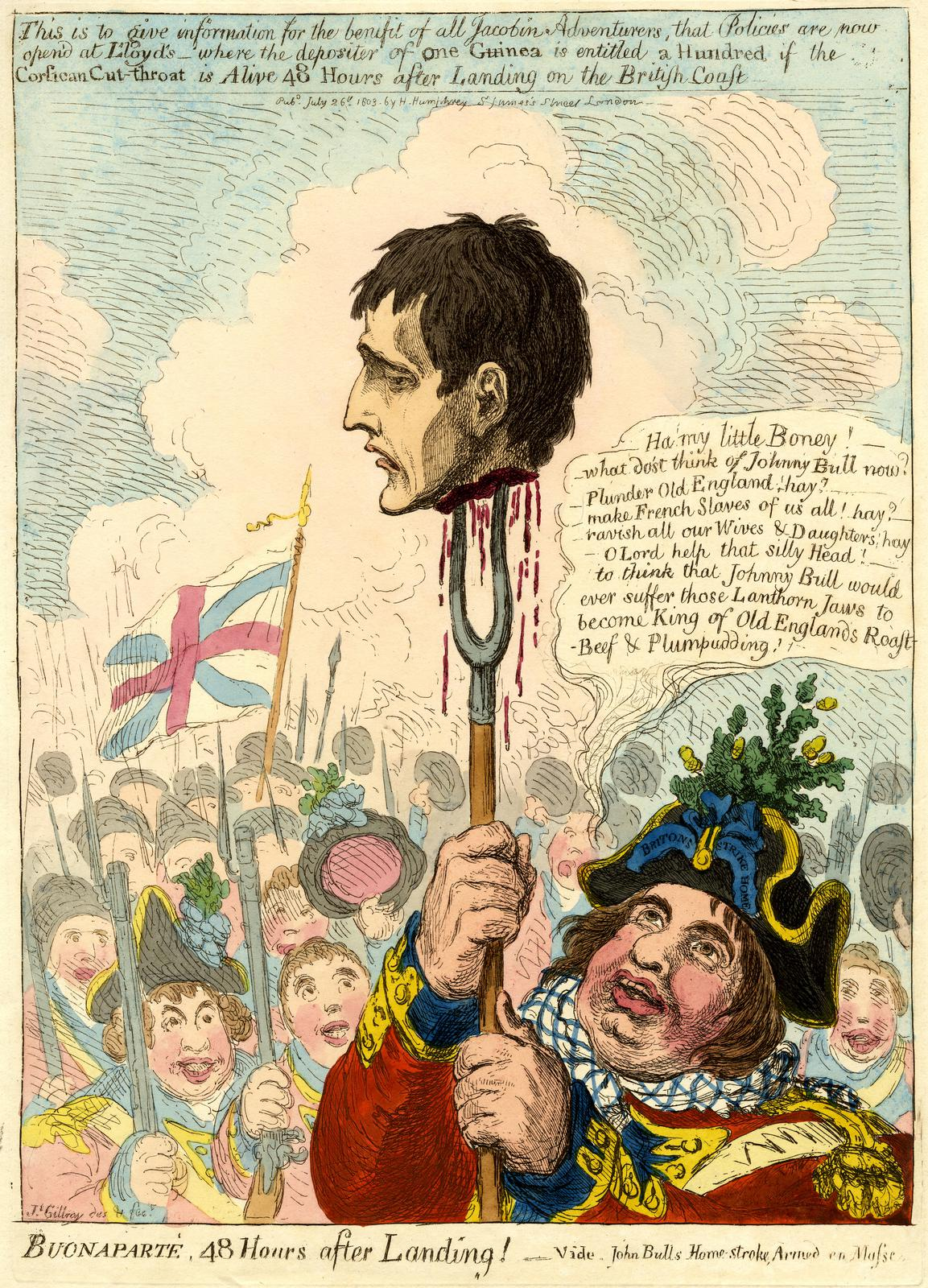
Propaganda work by James Gillray (1803) showing British icon John Bull holding the head of Napoleon Bonaparte on a pitchfork after a conjectured French invasion of Great Britain

The Gangster Disciples, a street gang in the Midwestern United States, use a three-pointed pitchfork as one of their symbols.

== See also ==
- Fork
- Garden fork
- Trident
