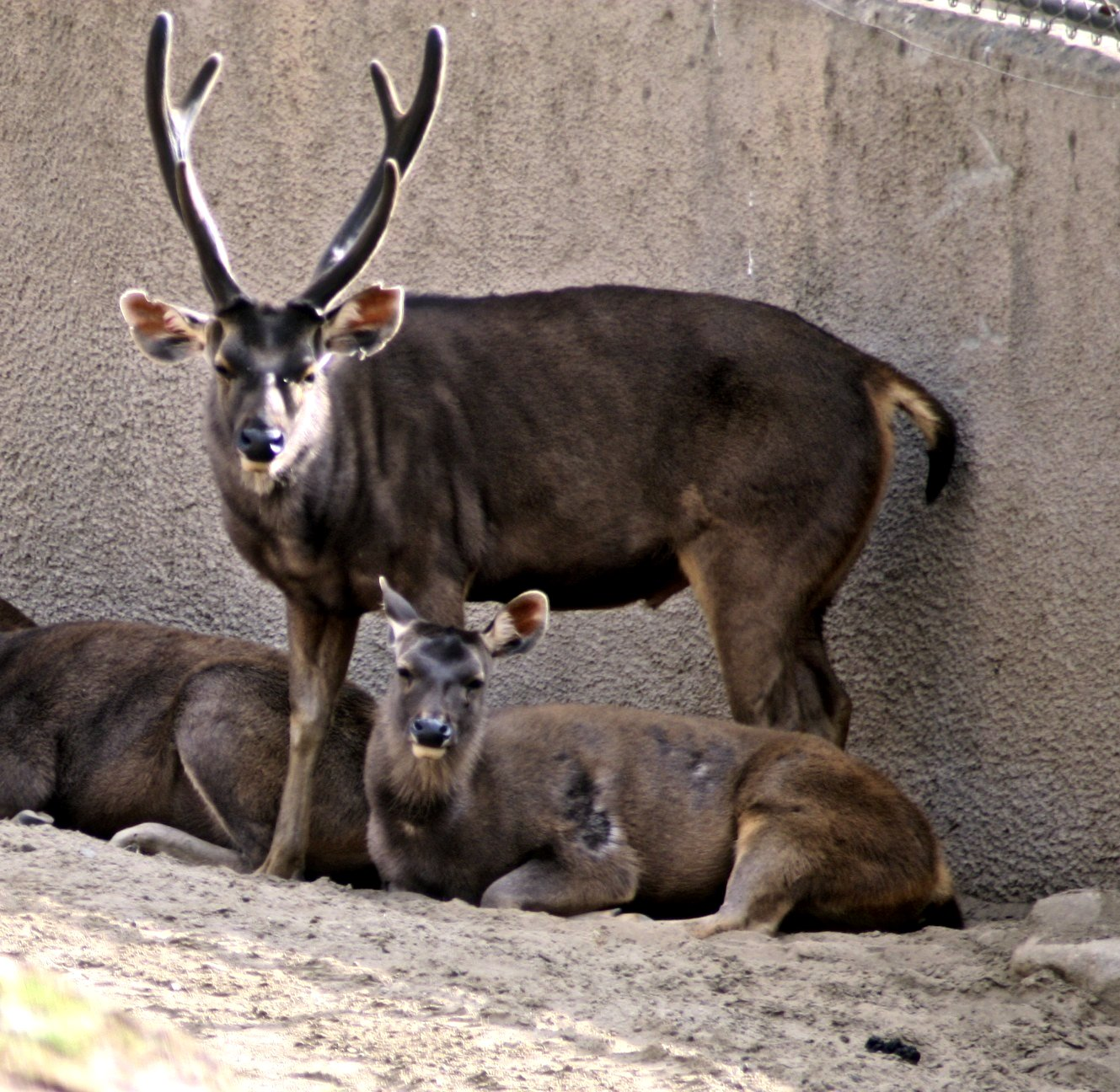

Scientific classification
- Kingdom: Animalia
- Phylum: Chordata
- Class: Mammalia
- Infraclass: Placentalia
- Order: Artiodactyla
- Family: Cervidae
- Genus: Rusa
- Species: R. unicolor
- Subspecies: R. u. equina

Trinomial name
- Rusa unicolor equina (G. Cuvier, 1823)

= Malayan sambar =

Subspecies of the sambar

The Malayan sambar (Rusa unicolor equina) is a subspecies of the sambar in the genus Rusa. It is one of the 75 mammal species that have been identified in the RER area in the Kampar Peninsula. Currently, there are seven subspecies of sambar deer with the Malayan sambar being one of the seven. Sambar deer usually reach a height of 3ft to 5ft. or 1-1.5 meters and usually weigh as much as 545 kilograms.

== Gallery ==
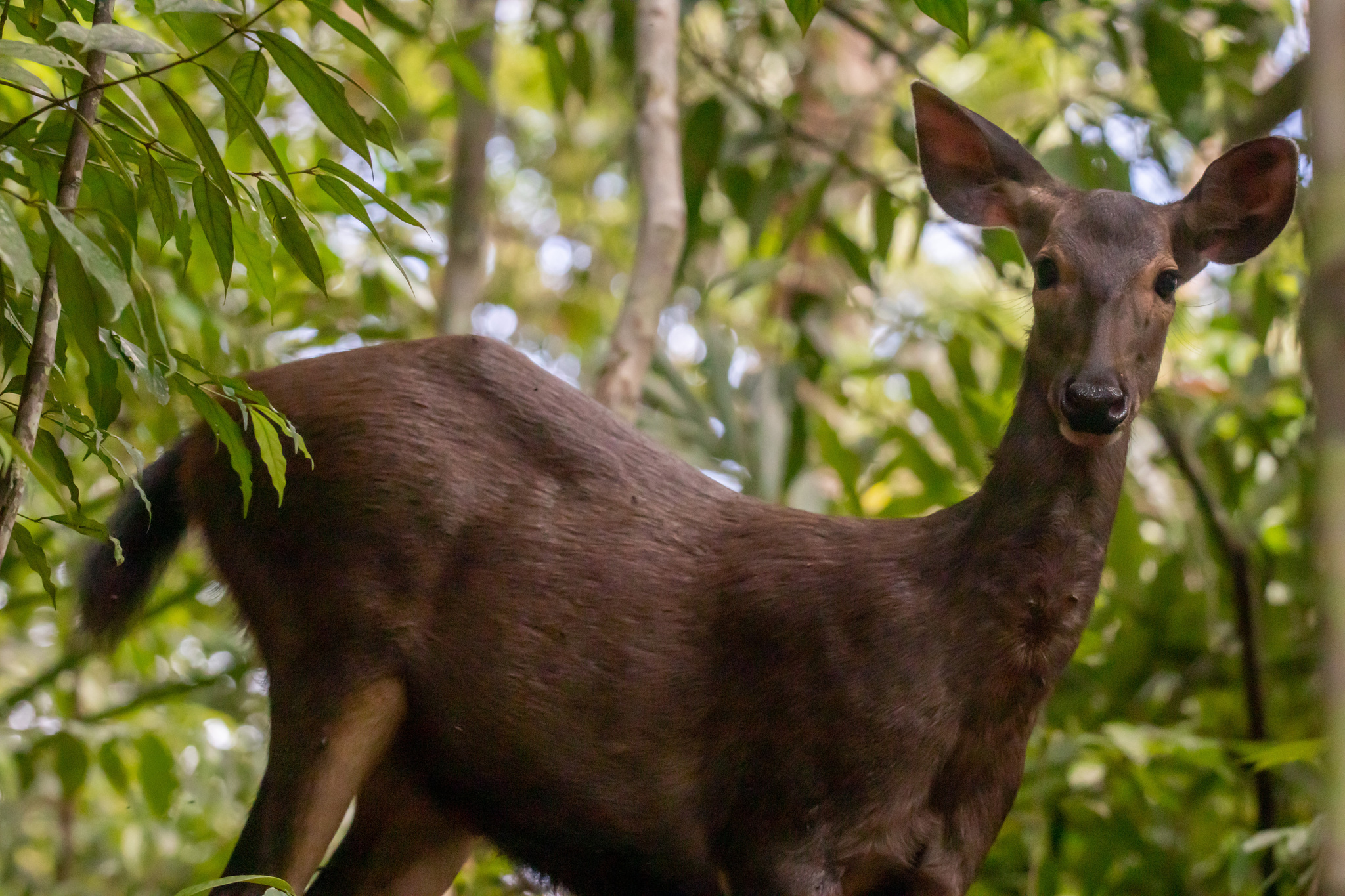

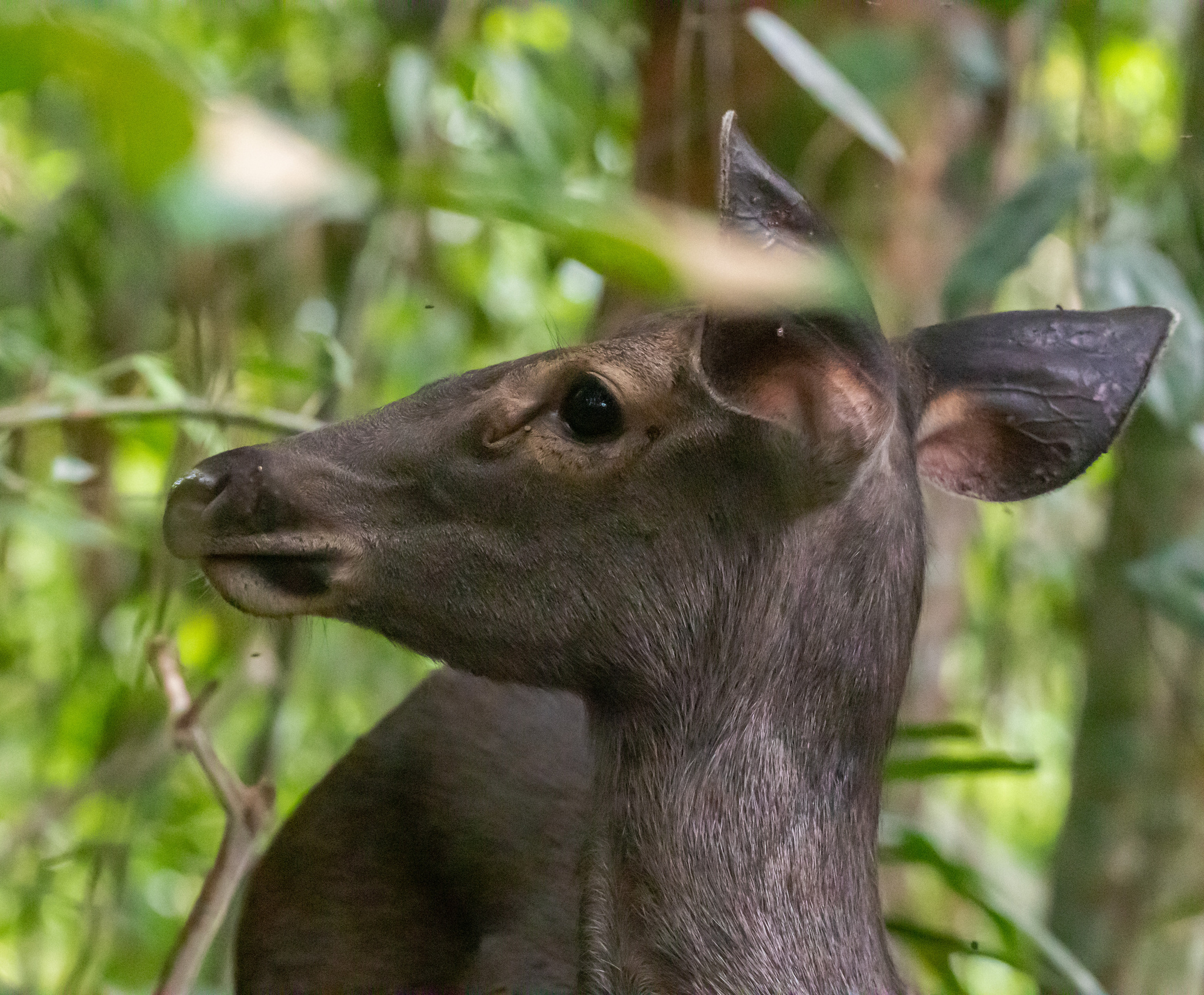
