= Duripan =

Subsurface soil horizon cemented by silica

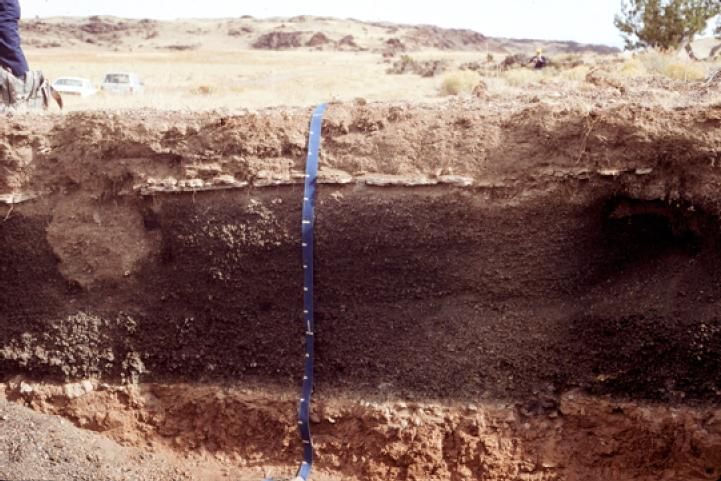
A duripan in Arizona

A duripan is a diagnostic soil horizon of the USDA soil taxonomy that is cemented by illuvial silica into a subsurface hardpan. Similar to a fragipan, Petrocalcic Horizon and petrogypsic horizon, it is firmly cemented and restricts soil management. In soil descriptions, they are most often denoted by the symbol Bqm. The closest equivalent in the Canadian system of soil classification is called a duric horizon, although it does not mean exactly the same thing as a duripan in the United States. They form almost exclusively in arid or Mediterranean climates, and can be as hard as concrete, which makes plowing very difficult or impossible. Soils that include duripans are generally used for grazing or wildlife habitat, and are seldom cultivated.

== Characteristics ==
The required characteristics for a duripan, according to the "Keys to USDA soil taxonomy, Tenth Edition, 2006" are:

1. The pan is cemented or indurated in more than 50 percent of the volume of some horizon; and
2. The pan shows evidence of accumulation of opal or other forms of silica, such as laminar caps, coatings, lenses, partly filled interstices, bridges between sand-sized grains, or coatings on rock or pararock fragments; and
3. Less than fifty percent of the volume of air-dry fragments slakes in 1 N HCl even during prolonged soaking, but more than 50 percent slakes in concentrated KOH or NaOH or in alternating acid and alkali; and
4. Because of lateral continuity, roots can penetrate the pan only along vertical fractures with a horizontal spacing of 10 cm or more.

What this means in plain English is:

1. More than half the horizon is made up of cemented materials.
2. There is evidence that the horizon was actually formed by movement of silica into the subsoil.
3. The purpose of the water, HCl, and KOH tests is to separate a duripan from a Petrocalcic Horizon or fragipan. These tests are seldom conducted in a field environment and usually are performed in a lab with prepared field samples.
4. The main purpose of describing a duripan is to denote limitations for land management. If plant roots are able to penetrate the duripan then there is no significant limitation and there would be little point in describing a duripan.

== Genesis ==
Duripans occur mostly in arid or semiarid climates, where the soil is usually dry or seasonally dry. Soils with duripans are often geographically associated with areas of volcanic activity, and show evidence of ash or volcanic glass deposition. Volcanic glass weathers rapidly, providing an ample supply of soluble silica to cement the underlying soil. Other common sources of the silica cementing agent are iron-magnesium minerals and feldspars. The parent material of duripan soils usually does not contain a large amount of calcium carbonate, and if there is an abundance of calcium, a Petrocalcic Horizon can form in conjunction with the duripan. The weathered silica is mostly transported by water into the subsoil, where it precipitates and forms microaggregates that gradually grow into a full-fledged duripan. It cannot be considered a duripan until the cracks and gaps that allow roots to penetrate are 10 cm or more apart. A duripan can sometimes be broken up by earthquakes or periods of alternate wetting and drying that cause small volume changes.

== See also ==
- USDA soil taxonomy
- Petrocalcic Horizon
- Fragipan
- Petrogypsic horizon
- Canadian system of soil classification
- Hardpan

More information on soils in specific areas of the United States can be found on Web Soil Survey at: https://websoilsurvey.nrcs.usda.gov/app/
