= Garden fork =

Garden tool with tines

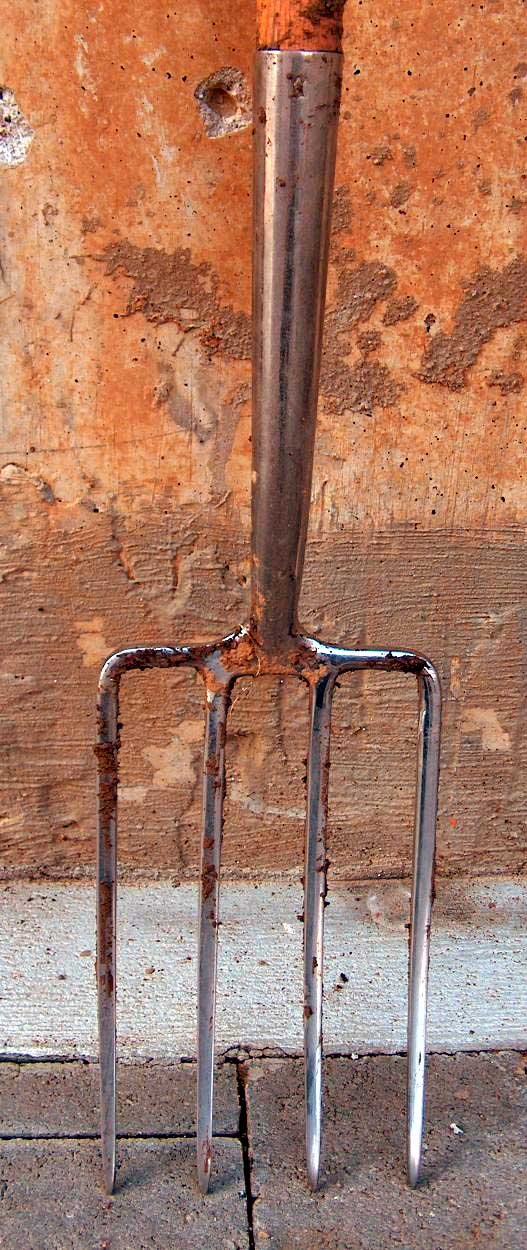
Garden fork

A garden fork, spading fork, or digging fork (in the past also an asparagus fork, the same name as a very different utensil) is a gardening implement, with a handle and a square-shouldered head featuring several (usually four) short, sturdy tines. It is used for loosening, lifting and turning over soil in gardening and farming, and not to be confused with the pitchfork, a similar tined tool used for moving (or throwing) loose materials such as hay, straw, silage, and manure.

== Uses ==
A garden fork is used similarly to a spade in loosening and turning over soil, especially compacted soil and heavy clay. Its tines allow it to be pushed more easily into the ground, and it can rake out stones and weeds and break up clods, it is not so easily stopped by stones, and it does not cut through weed roots or root-crops. Garden forks were originally made of wood, but the majority are now made of forged carbon steel or stainless steel.

== Types ==
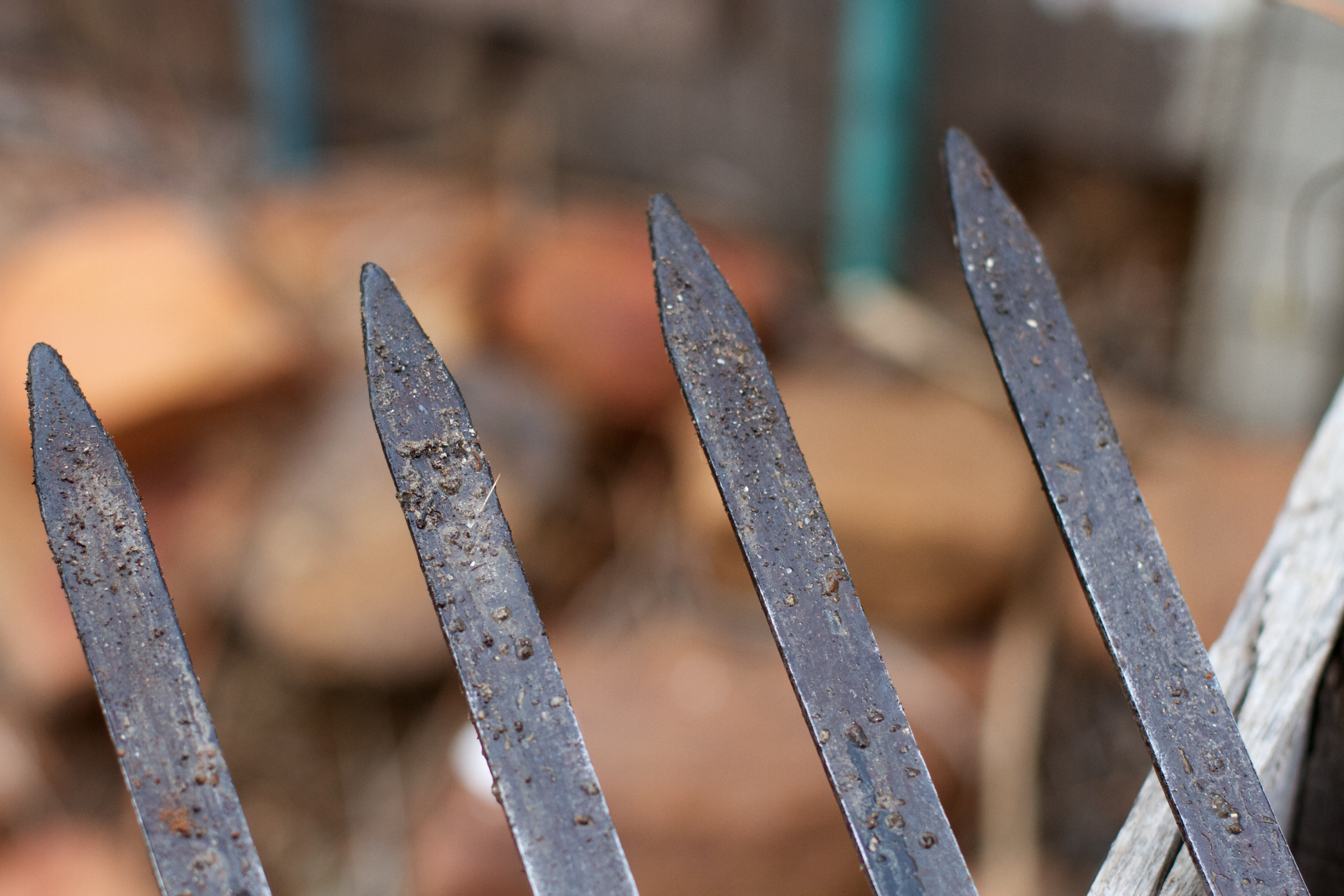
A fork with wide flat tines

Reflecting their differing uses, garden forks have shorter, flatter, thicker, and more closely spaced tines than pitchforks. They have comparatively a fairly short, stout, usually wooden handle, typically with a D- or T-shaped grab at the end.

A smaller version of such forks with shorter, closer-spaced, thinner tines (but a full-sized handle) is known as a border fork or ladies' fork, and is used for lighter work, such as weeding amongst other plants. Forks with broader, flatter tines are made for lifting potatoes and other root crops from the ground. A pair of forks back-to-back may used to lever apart dense clumps of roots.

== See also ==
- Broadfork—for breaking up hardpan
- Fork
- Garden tool
- Pitchfork—for lifting loose material such as hay
- Spade

== Sources ==
- Schweissguth, Paul Heinrich (15 April 1921). "Modern Method of Forging Garden Forks" (PDF). The Engineer: 414. Archived from the original on 23 October 2013 – via Grace's Guide to British Industrial History. (Trans. from Zeitschrift des Vereines Deutscher Ingenieure, 19 March 1921.)
- White, W.; Van Buren, J.; Camak, J. (2009) [1868]. Gardening for the South: Or, How to Grow Vegetables and Fruits. Bedford, Mass.: Applewood Books. ISBN 978-1-4290-1356-7.
