= Hardpan =

Dense layer of soil found below topsoil

In soil science, agriculture and gardening, hardpan or soil pan is a dense layer of soil, usually found below the uppermost topsoil layer. There are different types of hardpan, all sharing the general characteristic of being a distinct soil layer that is largely impervious to water. Some hardpans are formed by deposits in the soil that fuse and bind the soil particles. These deposits can range from dissolved silica to matrices formed from iron oxides and calcium carbonate. Others are man-made, such as hardpan formed by compaction from repeated plowing, particularly with moldboard plows, or by heavy traffic or pollution.

== Formations ==
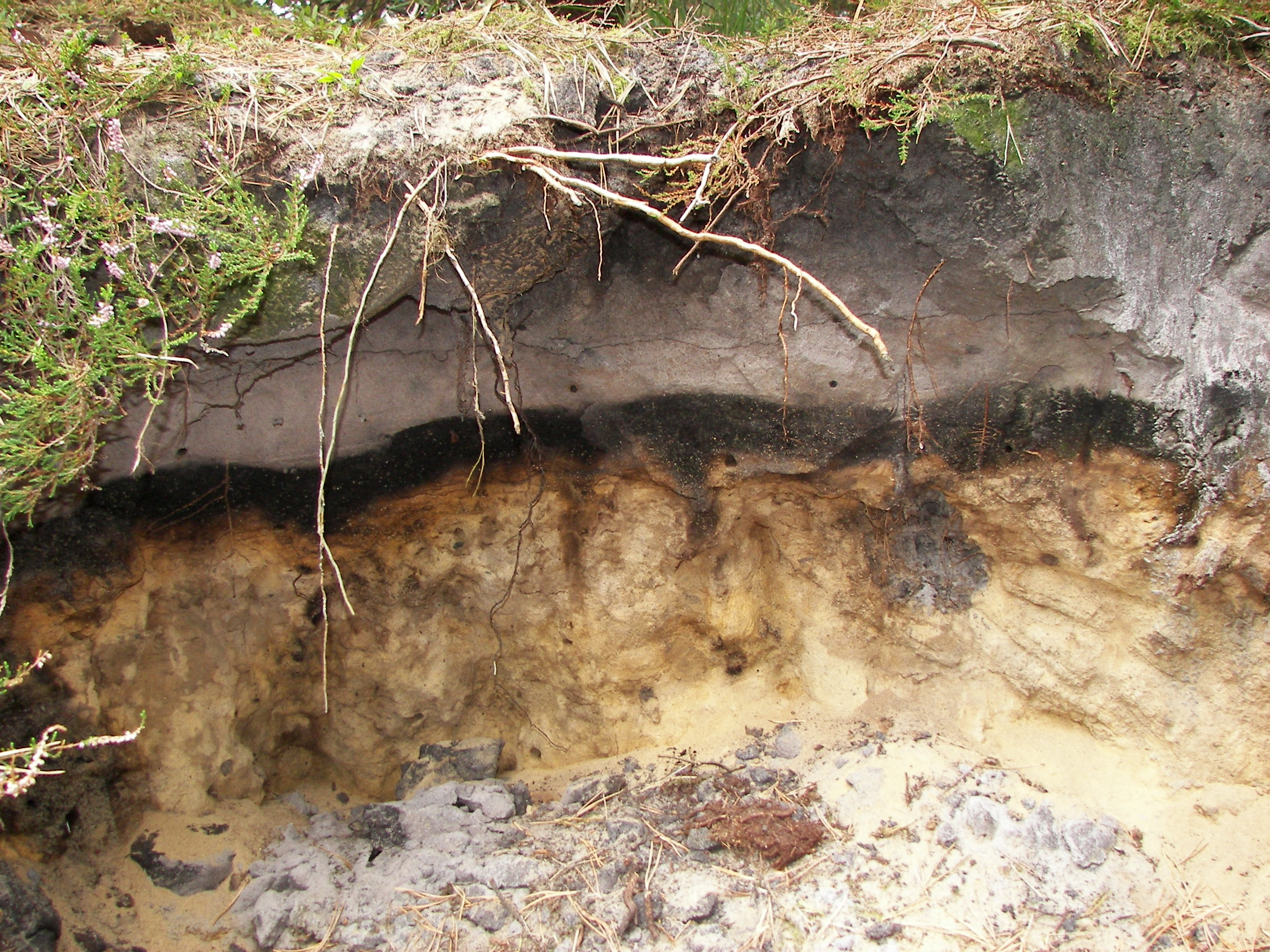

Soil structure strongly affects its tendency to form a hard pan. One such common soil condition related to hardpan is soil pH. Acidic soils are most often affected due to the propensity of certain mineral salts, most notably iron and calcium, to form hard complexes with soil particles under acidic conditions.

Another major determinant is the soil particle size. Clay particles are some of the smallest particles commonly found in soils. Due to their structure the space between individual clay particles is small and already restricts the passage of water, reducing infiltration and hence drainage. Soils with a high clay content are also easily compacted and affected by man-made discharges. Clay particles have a strong negative electrostatic charge and will readily bond to positively charged ions dissolved in the soil-water matrix. Common salts such as sodium ions contained in wastewater can fulfil this role and lead to a localized hardpan in some soil types. This is a common cause of septic system failure due to the prevention of proper drainage in field.

== Problems and workarounds ==
Hardpan can be a problem in farming and gardening by impeding drainage of water and restricting the growth of plant roots. In these situations, the hardpan can be broken up by either mechanical means such as digging or plowing, or through the use of soil amendments. The broadfork is a manual tool specifically designed for this task; a digging fork or a spade might also be used. The chisel plow does a similar job with the help of a tractor.

The use of soil amendments can also be employed to alter the soil structure and promote the dissolution of the hard pan. It has been observed that increasing the amount of soil organic matter through the working-in of manure, compost or peat can both improve local drainage and promote the proliferation of earth worms that can, over time, break hardpan layers.

More difficult hardpans may be further improved through the action of both adjusting the soil pH with lime if the soil is acidic, and with the addition of gypsum. This combination can help loosen clay particles bound into a hardpan by the actions of hard salts such as iron, calcium carbonate and sodium, by promoting their mobility through a higher pH while proving a suitable source of exchanging minerals (the gypsum). This works because gypsum salts, although not "soft", are still water permeable and have a larger, more open structure, the results of which do not promote as hard a matrix as was replaced. However, unlike when employing mechanical means, breaking a hardpan through the use of amendments may require action over the course of years, and even then one is by no means assured success. The results are primarily determined by how extensive and / or intractable the hardpan is.

== See also ==
- Caliche
- Claypan
- Duricrust
- Duripan
- Fragipan
- Forestiere Underground Gardens
