= Tine (structural) =

Spike on a tool or utensil

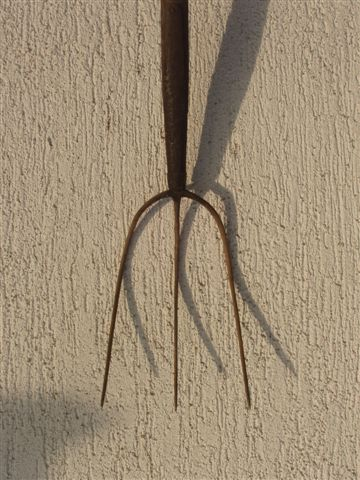
A three-tined pitchfork

Tines (/ˈtaɪnz/; also spelled tynes), prongs or teeth are parallel or branching spikes forming parts of a tool or natural object. They are used to spear, hook, move or otherwise act on other objects. They may be made of wood, bone, metal, or similar materials.

The number of tines on tools varies widely. A pitchfork may have just two, a garden fork may have four, and a rake or harrow many. Tines may be blunt, such as those on a fork used as an eating utensil; or sharp, as on a pitchfork; or even barbed, as on a trident. The terms tine and prong are synonymous. A tooth of a comb is a tine. The term is also used on musical instruments such as the Jew's harp, tuning fork, guitaret, electric piano, music box or mbira (kalimba) which contain long protruding metal spikes ("tines") which are plucked to produce notes.

Tines and prongs occur in nature—for example, forming the branched bony antlers of deer or the forked horns of pronghorn antelopes. The term tine is also used for mountains, such as the fictional Silvertine in The Lord of the Rings.

In chaos theory (physics, non-linear dynamics), the branches of a bifurcation diagram are called tines and subtines.
