= Double digging =

Gardening technique

Double digging with spade and fork loosens the soil, to increase drainage and aeration.

Double digging is a gardening technique used to increase soil drainage and aeration. It involves the loosening of two layers of soil, and the addition of organic matter.

Double digging is typically done when cultivating soil in a new garden, or when deep topsoil is required. On poor or heavy soils, or for vegetable gardens, double digging might be required every 3–5 years. In other cases, double digging is only really needed when starting a new garden, or on total replanting.

First the top layer is dug off with a spade, forming a shallow trench, and then the under-layer (at the bottom of the trench) is dug with a fork. When breaking up the lower layer, organic matter such as compost is usually added to the soil. If the soil is in need of other minerals like gypsum or phosphorus, this can also be added here.

A second trench is then started, backfilling the first trench. This process is repeated until the whole bed has been treated. There will be soil left over from the first trench, which is used to fill the last trench.

Walking on top of the bed will tend to compact it, so the gardener must be sure to protect the soil from too much foot traffic.
