= Water sprout =

Sprout from latent bud

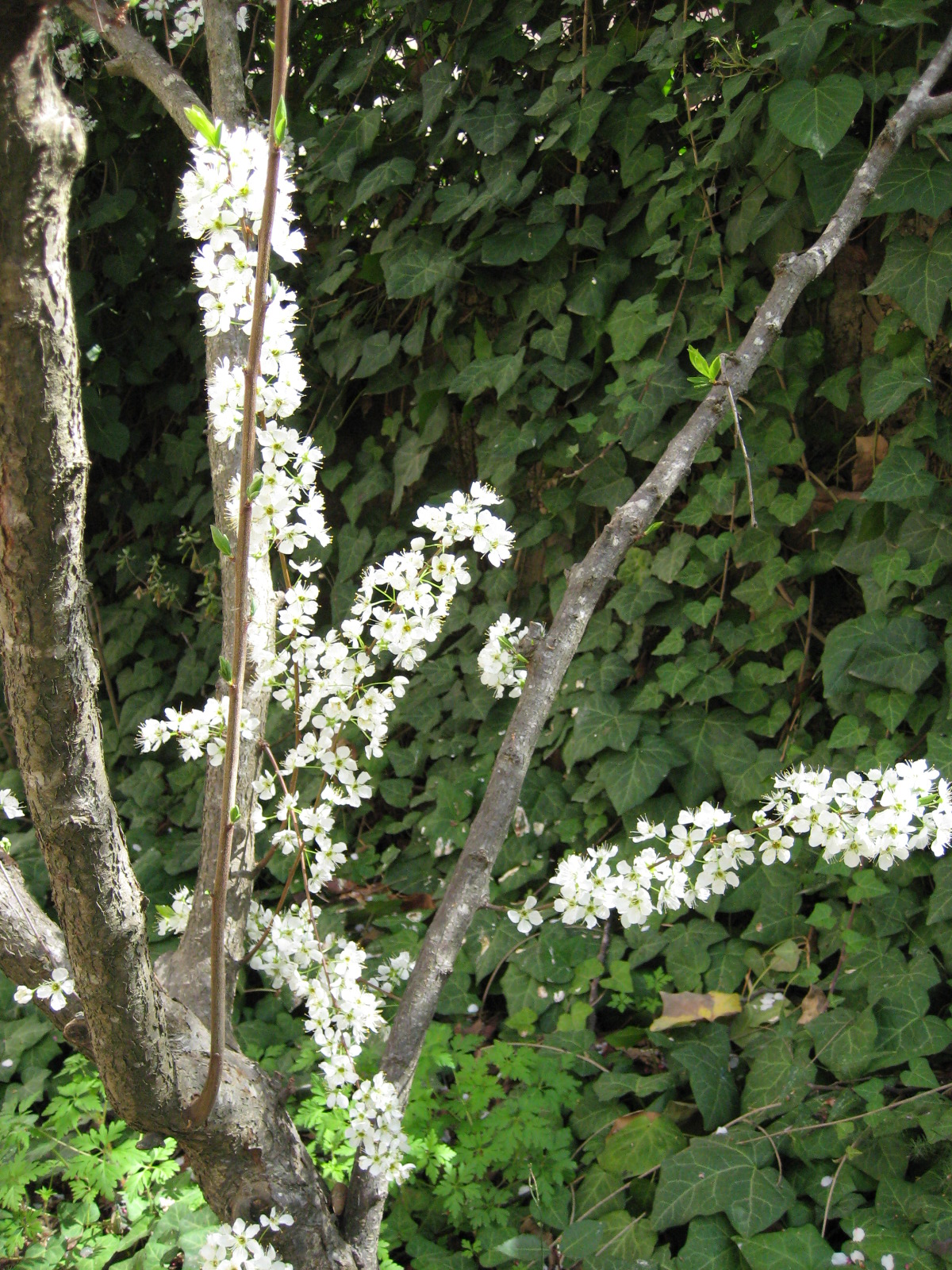
Vertical water sprout on Prunus

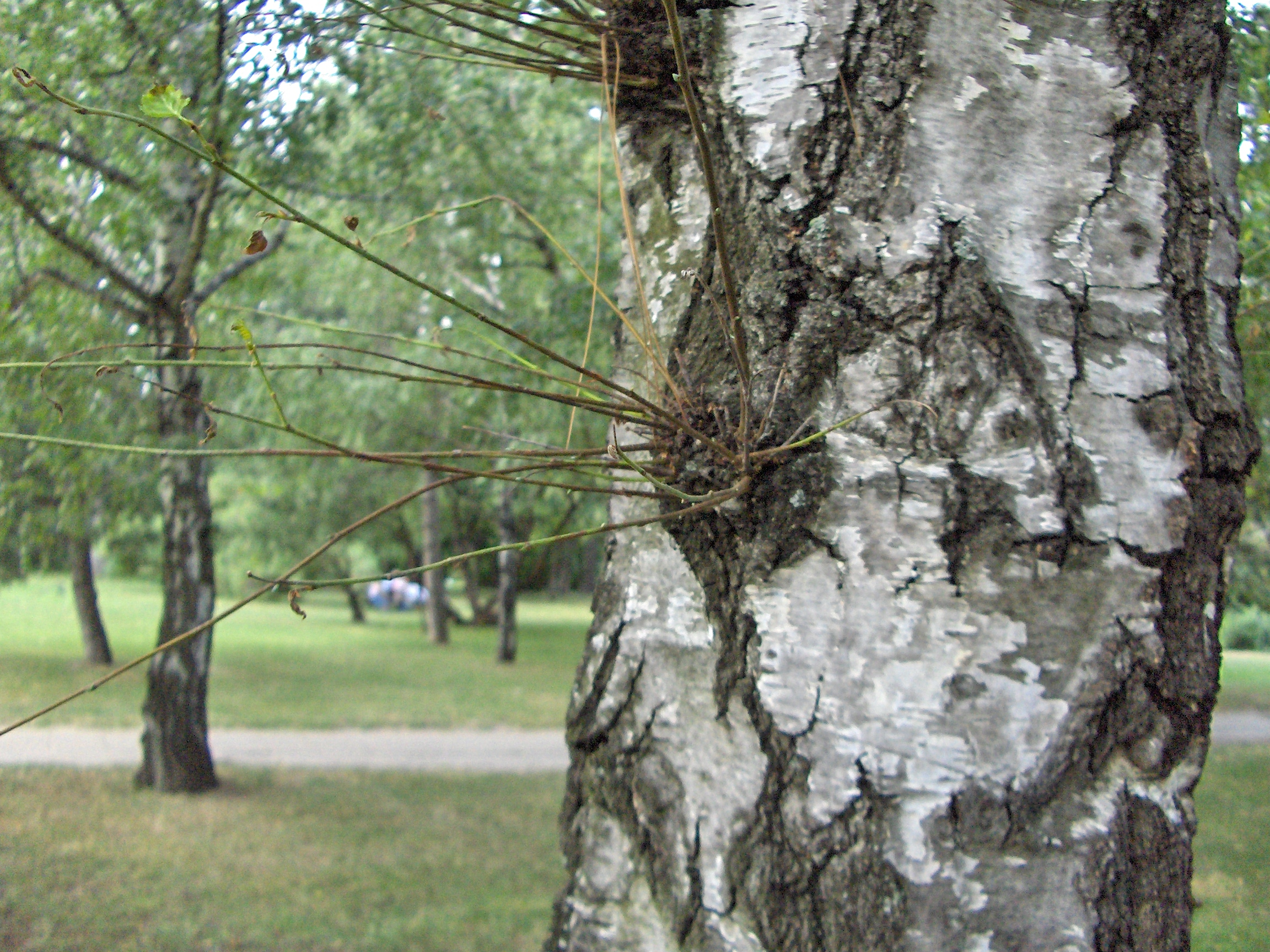
Water sprouts arising from epicormic buds within the trunk of Betula

Water sprouts or water shoots are shoots that arise from the trunk of a tree or from branches that are several years old, from latent buds. The latent buds might be visible on the bark of the tree, or submerged under the bark as epicormic buds. They are sometimes called suckers, although that term is more correctly applied to shoots that arise from below ground, from the roots, and a distance from the trunk.

Vigorous upright water sprouts often develop in response to various factors such as physical damage, heavy pruning (or pruning in general), sub-par environmental conditions (drought, overhydration, or improper soil conditions), and in response to pest and/or disease.

The structure of water-sprout regrowth is not as strong as that of the original tree, and the shoots are more subject to diseases and pests. This type of shoot is undesirable on orchard trees because very little fruit is produced on them.

== Species prone to water sprout growth ==
Water sprouts can form on many different types of tree. Some species are predisposed to them. Some of the most affected genera are apple (Malus), oak (Quercus), maple (Acer), and dogwood (Cornus).

== Water sprouts for grafting ==
Young vigorous water sprouts can be used in grafting. Water sprouts are selected for this process due to their age and flexibility classifying them as a soft wood cutting ideal for the practice. This is especially prevalent in fruit tree production.

== See also ==
- Adventitiousness, shoots that develop in unusual places
- Apical dominance, dominance of the main central stem of a plant
- Basal shoots, also called suckers
- Coppicing, a method of woodland management
- Epicormic shoot, shoots that develop from buds under the bark
- Pollarding, a pruning system in which the upper branches of a tree are removed, which encourages watersprouts
