= Resprouter =

Plants able to survive fire by resprouting

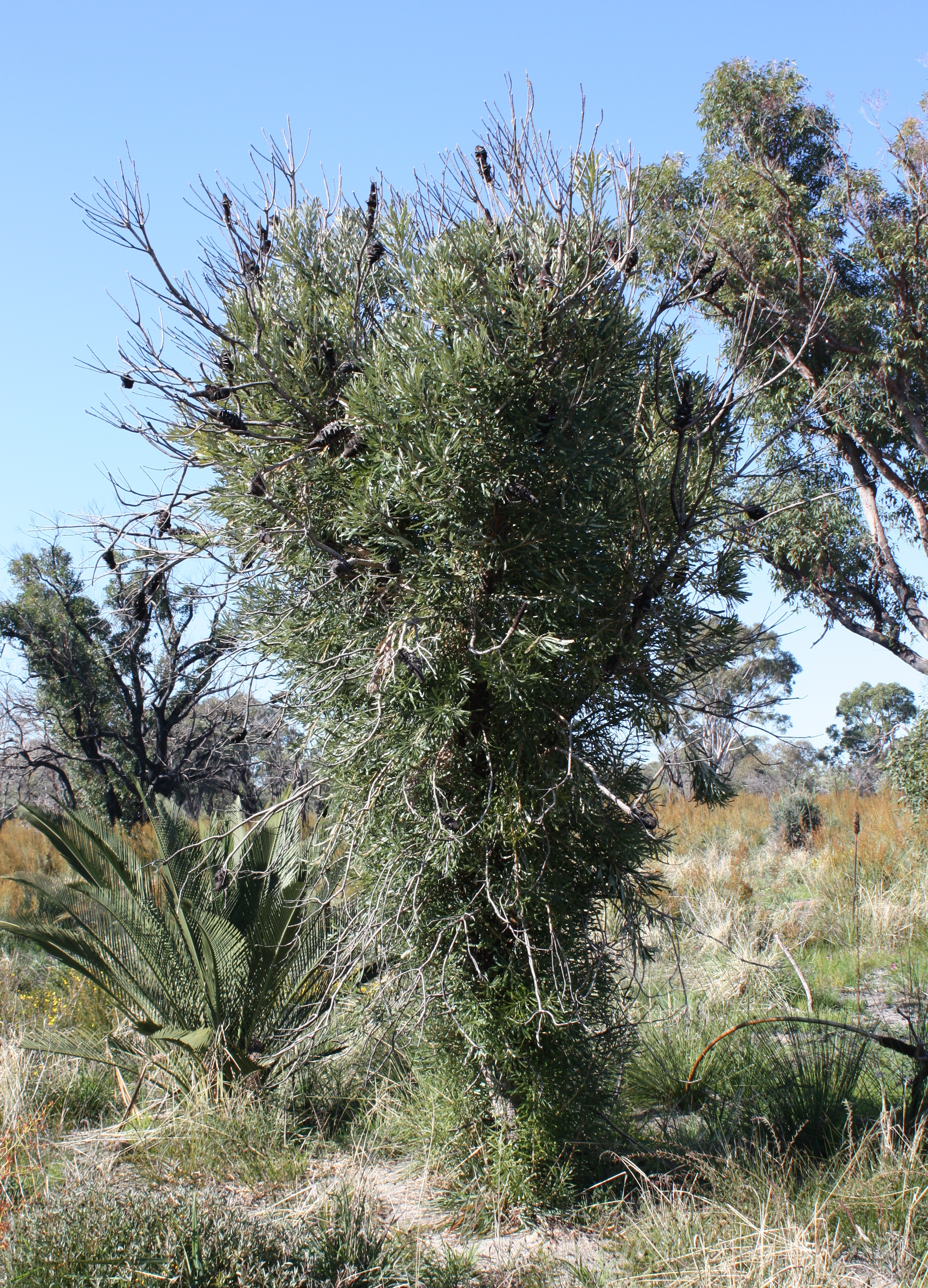
Banksia attenuata resprouting from epicormic buds following a bushfire

Resprouters are plant species that are adapted to survive fire by the activation of dormant vegetative buds to produce regrowth.

Plants may resprout from a bud bank that can be located in different places, including in the trunk or major branches (epicormic shoots) or in belowground structures like lignotubers, bulbs, and other structures.

Resprouters characterize chaparral, fynbos, kwongan, savanna and other landscapes that experience periodic fires.

== See also ==
- Adventitiousness
- Coppicing
- Crown sprouting
- Cutting (plant)
- Geoxyle
- Water sprout
