= Coppicing =

Method of woodland management

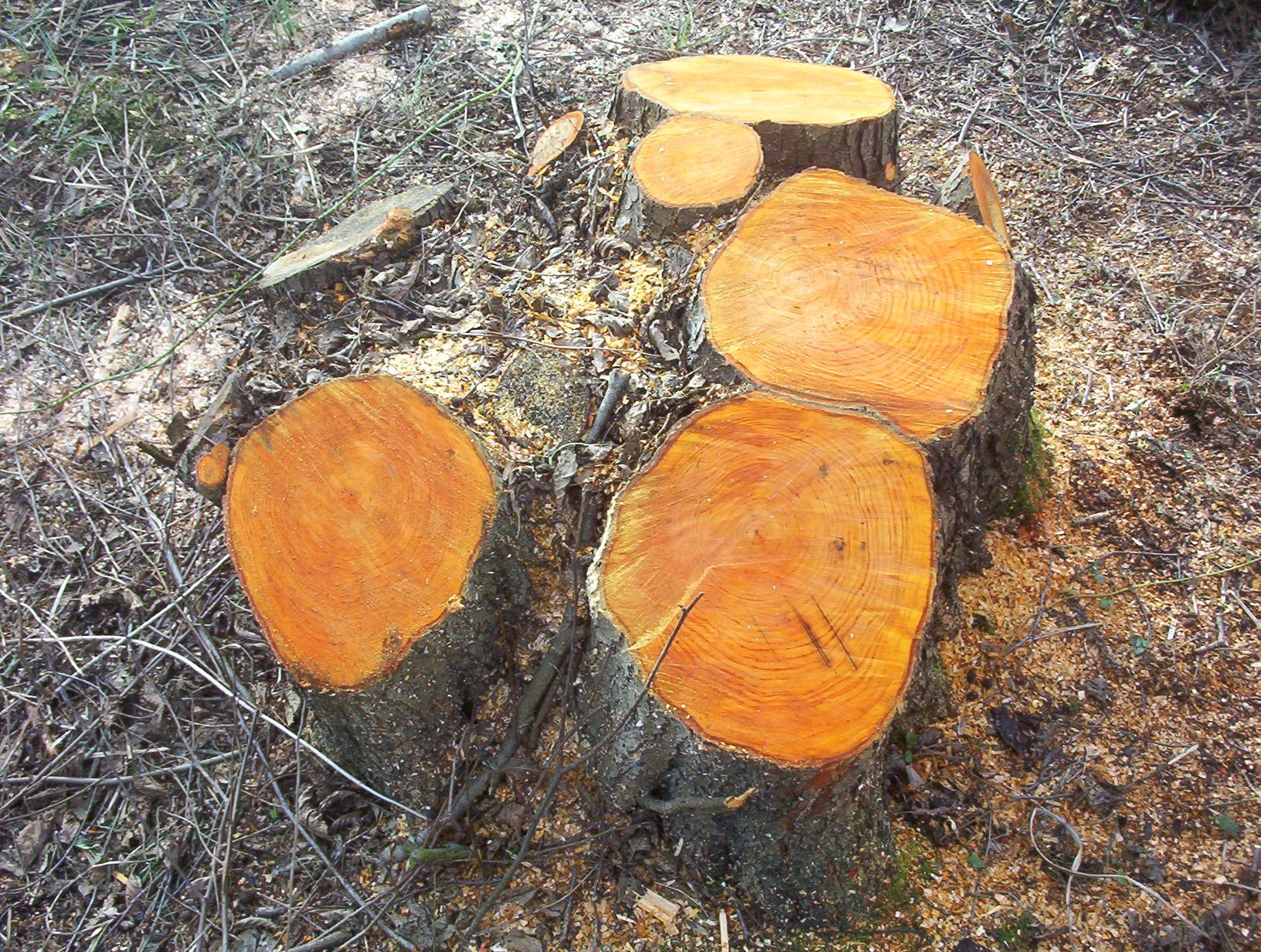
Coppice stool shortly after coppicing

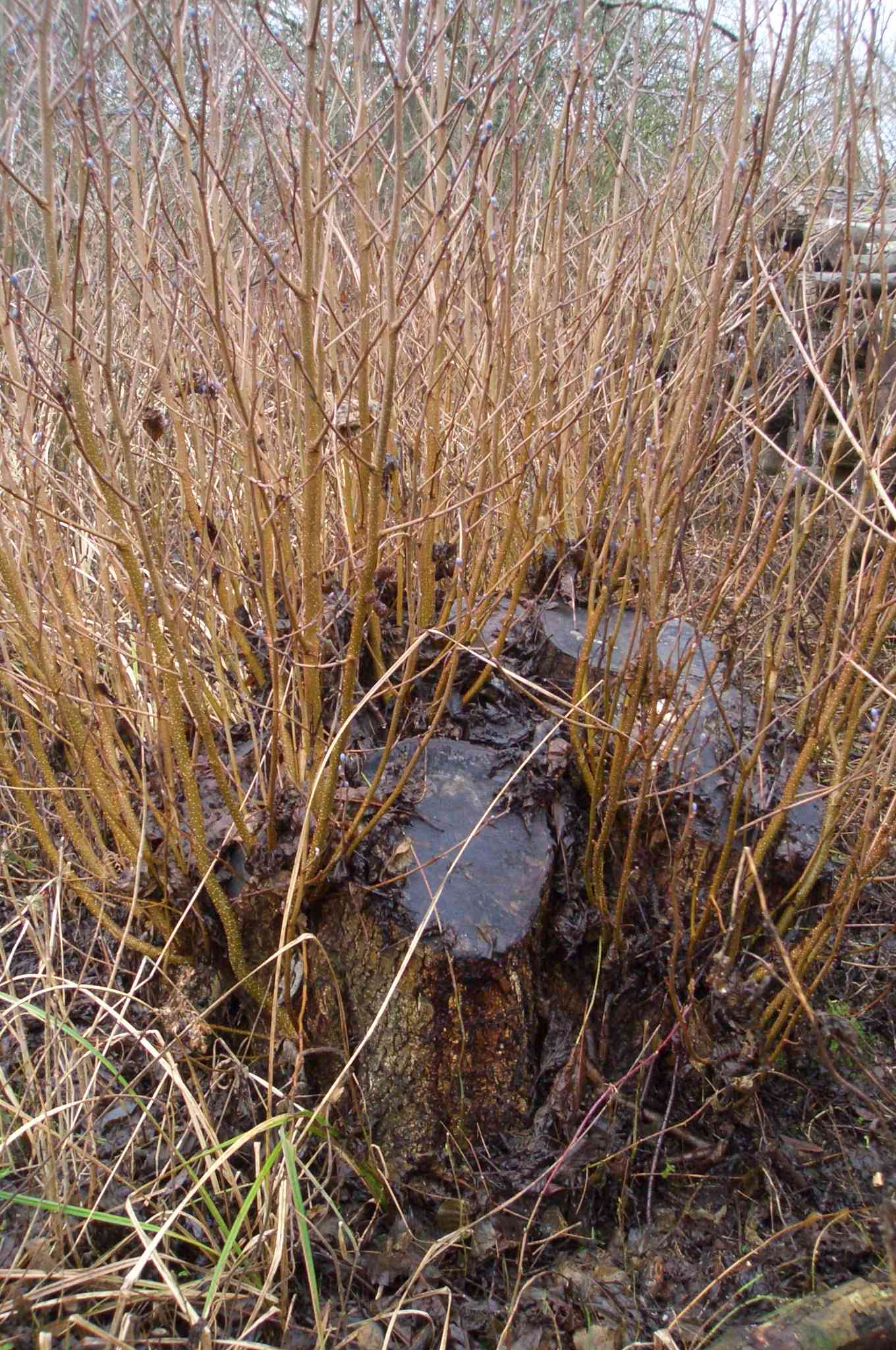
After one year's regrowth

Coppiced alder in Hampshire, UK

Coppicing /ˈkɒpɪsɪŋ/ is the traditional method in woodland management of cutting down a tree to a stump, which in many species encourages new shoots to grow from the stump or roots, thus ultimately regrowing the tree. A forest or grove that has been subject to coppicing is called a copse /kɒps/ or coppice, in which young tree stems are repeatedly cut down to near ground level. The resulting living stumps are called stools. New growth emerges, and after a number of years, the coppiced trees are harvested, and the cycle begins anew. Pollarding is a similar process carried out at a higher level on the tree in order to prevent grazing animals from eating new shoots. Daisugi (台杉, where sugi refers to Japanese cedar) is a similar Japanese technique.

Many silviculture practices involve cutting and regrowth; coppicing has been of significance in many parts of lowland temperate Europe. The widespread and long-term practice of coppicing as a landscape-scale industry is something that remains of special importance in southern England. Many of the English language terms referred to in this article are particularly relevant to historic and contemporary practice in that area.

Typically a coppiced woodland is harvested in sections or coups (also spelled 'coupe' but pronounced 'coop' and descended from the French or Norman French 'couper', to cut or coupé 'has been cut') on a rotation. English terms for an area of coppice include 'cant', 'panel' and 'fall' which can be interchangeable and regionally-based. In this way, a crop is available each year somewhere in the woodland. Coppicing has the effect of providing a rich variety of habitats, as the woodland always has a range of different-aged coppice growing in it, which is beneficial for biodiversity. The cycle length depends upon the species cut, the local custom, and the use of the product. Birch can be coppiced for faggots on a three- or four-year cycle, whereas oak can be coppiced over a fifty-year cycle for poles or firewood.

Trees being coppiced do not die of old age as coppicing maintains the tree at a juvenile stage, allowing them to reach immense ages. The age of a stool may be estimated from its diameter; some are so large—as much as 5.5 metres (18 ft) across—that they are thought to have been continually coppiced for centuries.

== History ==
Evidence suggests that coppicing has been continuously practised since pre-history. Coppiced stems are characteristically curved at the base. This curve occurs as the competing stems grow out from the stool in the early stages of the cycle, then up towards the sky as the canopy closes. The curve may allow the identification of coppice timber in archaeological sites. Timber in the Sweet Track in Somerset (built in the winter of 3807 and 3806 BCE) has been identified as coppiced Tilia species.

Originally, the silvicultural system now called coppicing was practised solely for small wood production. In German this is called Niederwald, which translates as low forest. Later on in medieval times, farmers encouraged pigs to feed from acorns, and so some trees were allowed to grow bigger. This different silvicultural system is called in English coppice with standards. In German this is called Mittelwald (middle forest). As modern forestry (Hochwald in German, which translates as high forest) seeks to harvest timber mechanically, and pigs are generally no longer fed from acorns, both systems have declined. However, there are cultural and wildlife benefits from these two silvicultural systems, so both can be found where timber production or some other main forestry purpose (such as a protection forest against an avalanche) is not the sole management objective of the woodland.

In the 16th and 17th centuries, the technology of charcoal iron production became widely established in England, continuing in some areas until the late 19th century. Charcoal once fuelled all metalworking (with evidence dating back many thousands of years) and other high temperature industrial processes (see white coal) but scarcity led to the eventual adoption of coal as the primary fuel. Decline in charcoal as an industrial fuel accelerated after the discovery of coke (coal heated in limited oxygen) in the 18th century and leading to a crash in UK charcoal production in the century thereafter. Notably, scarcity of charcoal for industrial processes actually led to the survival of large areas of woodland in the weald of Kent and the Sussexes as large areas of coppiced woodland were jealously guarded by Roman ironmasters and later by Medieval ironmasters. Charcoal hearths in woodlands are indications of ancient status (in context).

Along with the need for oak bark for tanning, charcoal required large amounts of coppiced wood. With this coppice management, wood could be provided for those growing industries in principle indefinitely. This was regulated by a statute of 1544 of Henry VIII, which required woods to be enclosed after cutting (to prevent browsing by animals) and 12 standels (standards or mature uncut trees) to be left in each acre, to be grown into timber. Coppice with standards (scattered individual stems allowed to grow on through several coppice cycles) has been commonly used throughout most of Europe as a means of giving greater flexibility in the resulting forest product from any one area. The woodland provides the small material from the coppice as well as a range of larger timber for such uses as house building, bridge repair, cart-making and so on. But note that coppice produce was used in parallel with larger timber. For example, hazel and willow as woven wattle infill panels (daubed or plastered) in housebuilding and ash coppice to produce components for carts, and several species for components for bridge rails and fences.

In the 18th century coppicing in Britain began a long decline. This was brought about by the erosion of its traditional markets. Firewood was no longer needed for domestic or industrial uses as coal and coke became easily obtained and transported, and wood as a construction material was gradually replaced by newer materials. Coppicing died out first in the north of Britain and steadily contracted toward the south-east until by the 1960s active commercial coppice was heavily concentrated in Kent and Sussex.

== Practice ==
The shoots (or suckers) may be used either in their young state for interweaving in wattle fencing (as is the practice with coppiced willows and hazel), or the new shoots may be allowed to grow into large poles, as was often the custom with trees such as oaks or ashes and sweet chestnut (Castanea sativa). This creates long, straight poles which do not have the bends and forks of naturally grown trees. Coppicing may be practised to encourage specific growth patterns, as with cinnamon trees which are grown for their bark.

(Note that the use of the term 'suckers' above is incompatible with an accurate understanding of how coppice works. Coppice stems grow from epicormic buds developed from groups of cells called bud precursors in the cambium under the bark on cut stem bases. Epicormic buds develop and grow when the upper parts of the stem (which normally produce inhibitory plant hormone analogues) are removed. Suckers refers to shoots growing from roots in response to felling to ground as seen in wild cherry or gean (Prunus avium) and aspen (Populus tremula) but also has been adopted in horticulture to refer to a competing shoot sprouting from a rootstock below the interface with the scion. Such shoots (if not removed) can grow more vigorously than the grafted material which can fail and die).

Another, more complicated system is called compound coppice. Here some of the standards would be left, some harvested. Some of the coppice would be allowed to grow into new standards and some regenerated coppice would be there. Thus there would be three age classes. Coppiced hardwoods were used extensively in carriage and shipbuilding, and they are still sometimes grown for making wooden buildings and furniture.

Compound coppice is a term used for when two or more different species are grown in the same cant and cut on different cycles. Example: Hazel-ash coppice with hazel cut at 7 years and ash in the same area cut at 21 years (every third cut, all stools in the cant are cut). But note that under coppice with standards (for instance oak standards over hazel) the oak was cut under a much longer cycle. With hazel-ash under oak standards you now have 3 cycles superimposed. However, a range of ages of standards was managed-for to allow for continuity of oak production for timber (shipbuilding especially) and this was sometimes legislated for. It is commonly written that there should be 12 standards per acre. But this '12 per acre' includes (as an average over the whole wood) maybe 1 mature oak per acre, a couple of young standards and several waivers with a larger number of seedlings/saplings whose genesis was sporadic and occurred when oak mast years coincided with coppice cuts – planting being relatively rare until perhaps the 16th century. Coppice can be complicated, which is likely why large areas of one species (hazel, sweet chestnut) with no standards is called 'simple coppice'.

Waivers: (also 'wavers') Young oak trees (older than seedlings or saplings) that may become standards in due turn. Or may be cut before becoming standards. If you can get both hands around it at breast height but cannot get 4 Sussex fence rails out of the first 10', it is a waiver.

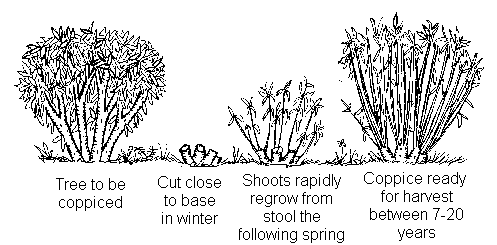
Diagram illustrating the coppicing cycle over a 7- to 20-year period

Withies for wicker-work are grown in coppices of various willow species, principally osier.

In France, sweet chestnut trees are coppiced for use as canes and bâtons for the martial art Canne de combat (also known as Bâton français).

Some Eucalyptus species are coppiced in a number of countries, including Australia, North America, Uganda, and Sudan.

The Sal tree is coppiced in India, and the Moringa oleifera tree is coppiced in many countries, including India.

Sometimes former coppice is converted to high-forest woodland by the practice of singling. All but one of the regrowing stems are cut, leaving the remaining one to grow as if it were a maiden (uncut) tree.

The boundaries of coppice coups were sometimes marked by cutting certain trees as pollards or stubs.

=== United Kingdom ===
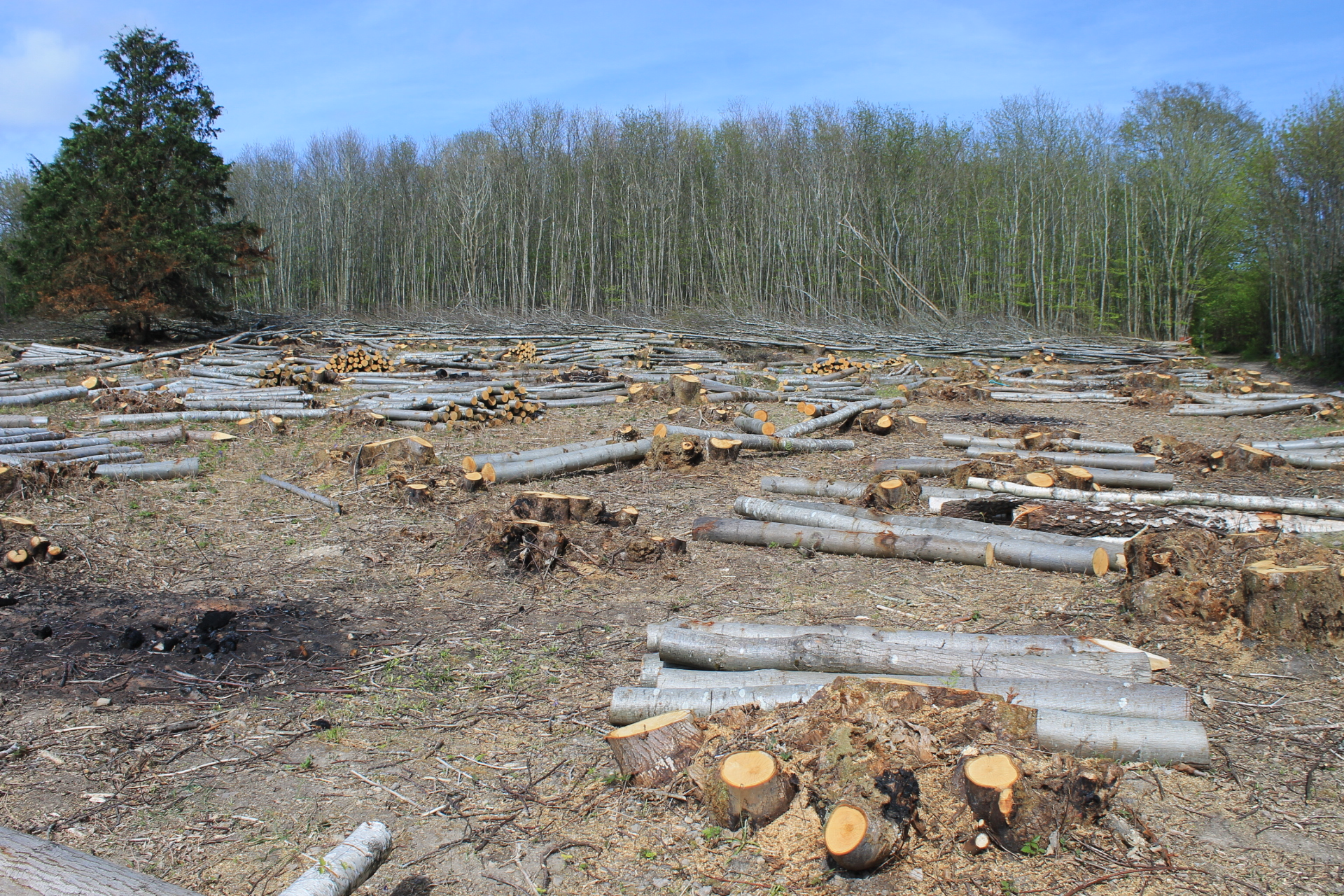
Recently felled chestnut coppice near Petworth in West Sussex

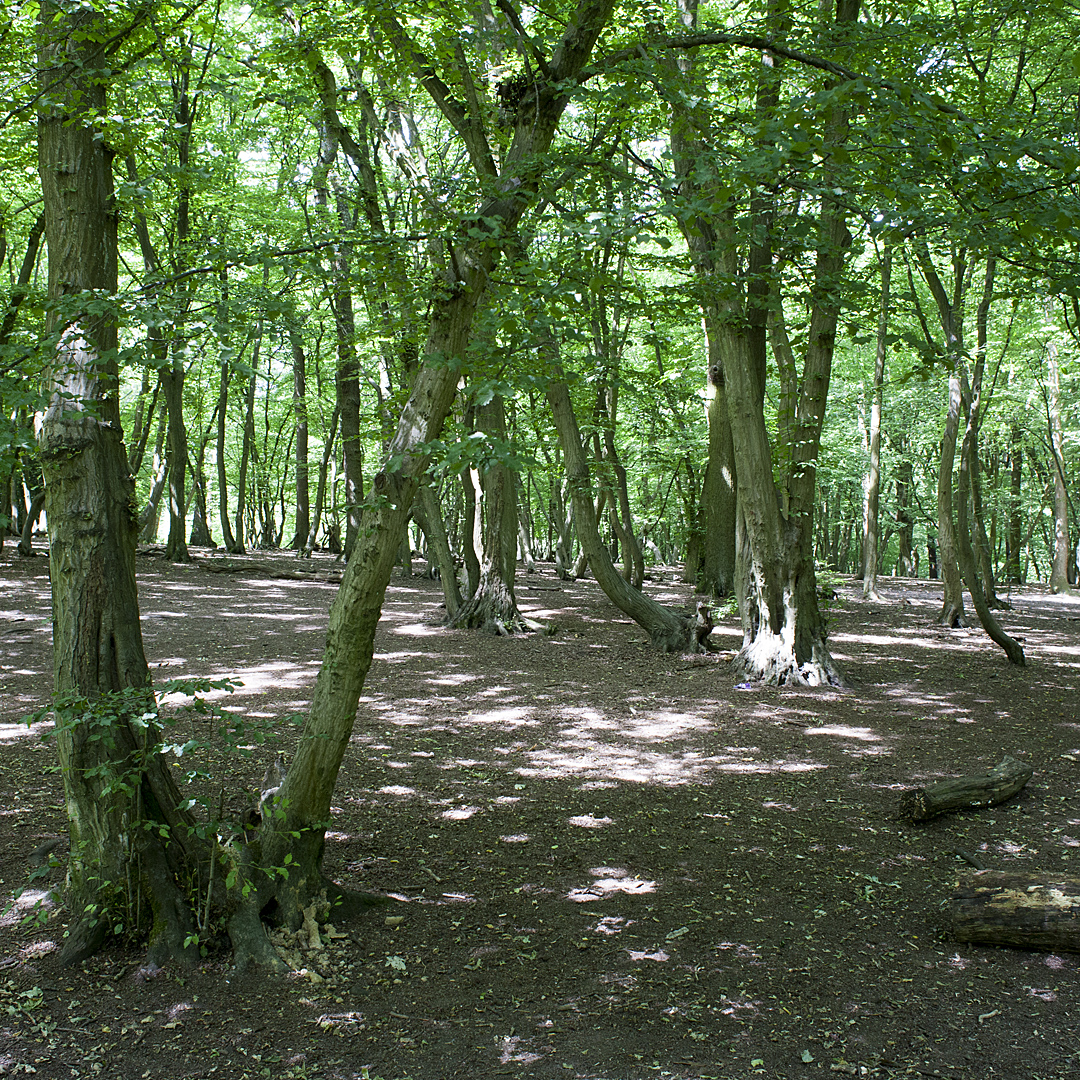
Old hornbeam coppice stools left uncut for at least 100 years, Coldfall Wood, London

In southern Britain, coppice was traditionally hazel, hornbeam, field maple, ash, sweet chestnut, occasionally sallow, elm, small-leafed lime and rarely oak or beech, grown among pedunculate or sessile oak, ash or beech standards. In wet areas alder and willows were used. A small, and growing, number of people make a living wholly or partly by working coppices in the area today, at places such as at the Weald and Downland Living Museum.

Coppices provided wood for many purposes, especially charcoal before coal was economically significant in metal smelting. A minority of these woods are still operated for coppice today, often by conservation organisations, producing material for hurdle-making, thatching spars, local charcoal-burning or other crafts. The only remaining large-scale commercial coppice crop in England is sweet chestnut which is grown in parts of Sussex and Kent. Much of this was established as plantations in the 19th century for hop-pole production (hop-poles are used to support the hop plant while growing hops) and is nowadays cut on a 12 to 18-year cycle for splitting and binding into cleft chestnut paling fence, or on a 20- to 35-year cycle for cleft post-and-rail fencing, or for sawing into small lengths to be finger-jointed for architectural use. Other material goes to make farm fencing and to be chipped for modern wood-fired heating systems.

In northwest England, coppice-with-standards has been the norm, the standards often of oak with relatively little simple coppice. After World War II, a great deal was planted up with conifers or became neglected. Coppice-working almost died out, though a few men continued in the woods.

== Wildlife ==
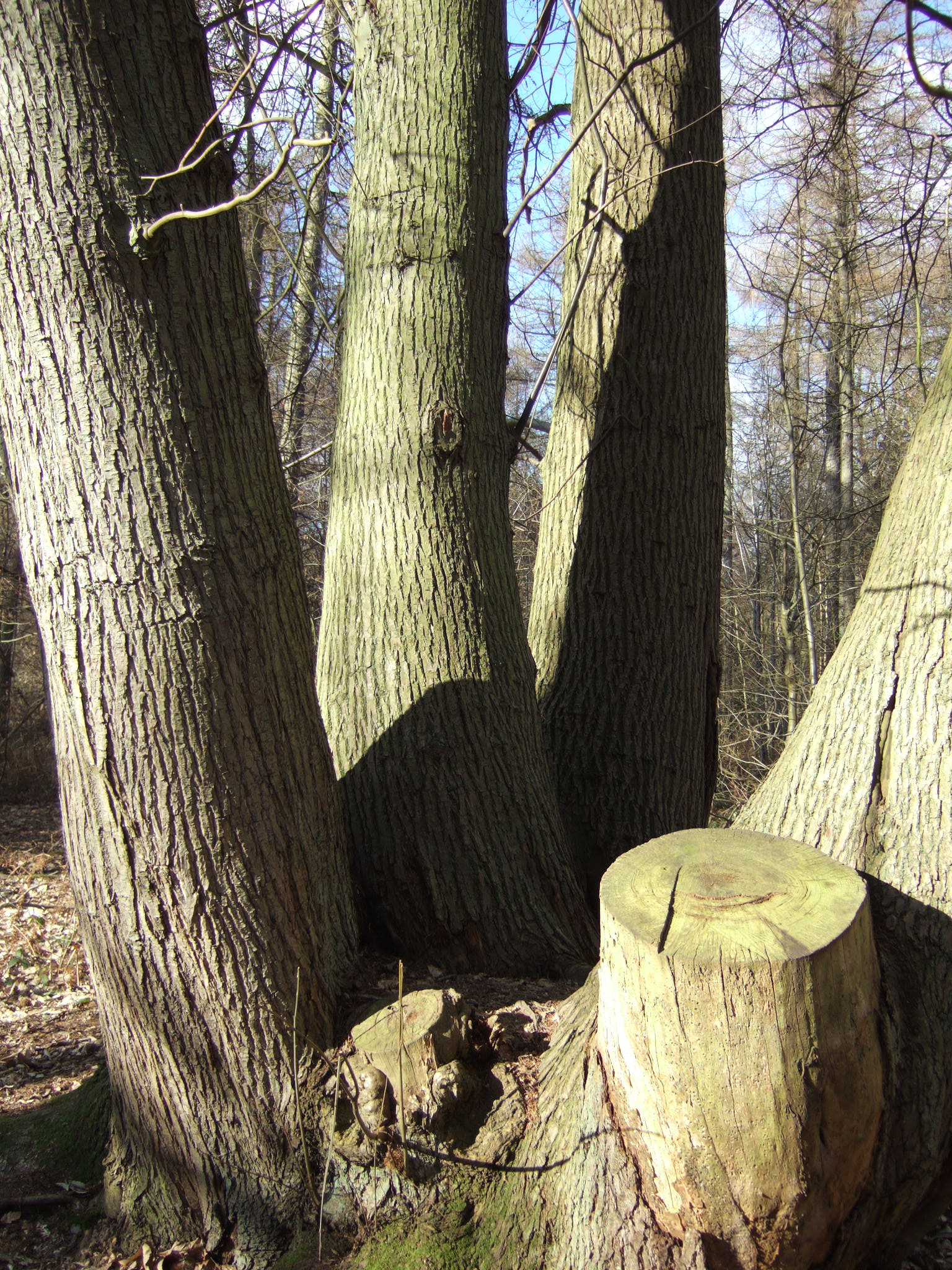
Overstood sweet chestnut coppice stool, Banstead Woods, Surrey

Coppice management favours a range of wildlife, often of species adapted to open woodland. After cutting, the increased light allows existing woodland-floor vegetation such as bluebell, anemone and primrose to grow vigorously. Often brambles grow around the stools, encouraging insects, or various small mammals that can use the brambles as protection from larger predators. Woodpiles (if left in the coppice) encourage insects such as beetles to come into an area. The open area is then colonised by many animals such as nightingale, European nightjar and fritillary butterflies. As the coup grows, the canopy closes and it becomes unsuitable for these animals again—but in an actively managed coppice there is always another recently cut coup nearby, and the populations therefore move around, following the coppice management.

However, most British coppices have not been managed in this way for many decades. The coppice stems have grown tall (the coppice is said to be overstood), forming a heavily shaded woodland of many closely spaced stems with little ground vegetation. The open-woodland animals survive in small numbers along woodland rides or not at all, and many of these once-common species have become rare. Overstood coppice is a habitat of relatively low biodiversity—it does not support the open-woodland species, but neither does it support many of the characteristic species of high forest, because it lacks many high-forest features such as substantial dead-wood, clearings and stems of varied ages. Suitable conservation management of these abandoned coppices may be to restart coppice management, or in some cases it may be more appropriate to use singling and selective clearance to establish a high-forest structure.

== Natural occurrence ==
Coppice and pollard growth is a response of the tree to damage, and can occur naturally. Trees may be browsed or broken by large herbivorous animals, such as cattle or elephants, felled by beavers or blown over by the wind. Some trees, such as linden, may produce a line of coppice shoots from a fallen trunk, and sometimes these develop into a line of mature trees. For some trees, such as the common beech (Fagus sylvatica), coppicing is more or less easy depending on the altitude: it is much more efficient for trees in the montane zone.

== For energy wood ==
Coppicing of willow, alder and poplar for energy wood has proven commercially successful. The Willow Biomass Project in the United States is an example of this. In this case the coppicing is done in a way that an annual or more likely a tri-annual cut can happen. This seems to maximize the production volume from the stand. Such frequent growth means the soils can be easily depleted and so fertilizers are often required. The stock also becomes exhausted after some years and so will be replaced with new plants. The method of harvesting of energy wood can be mechanized by adaptation of specialized agricultural machinery.

Species and cultivars vary in when they should be cut, regeneration times and other factors. However, full life cycle analysis has shown that poplars have a lower effect in greenhouse gas emissions for energy production than alternatives.

== Gallery ==
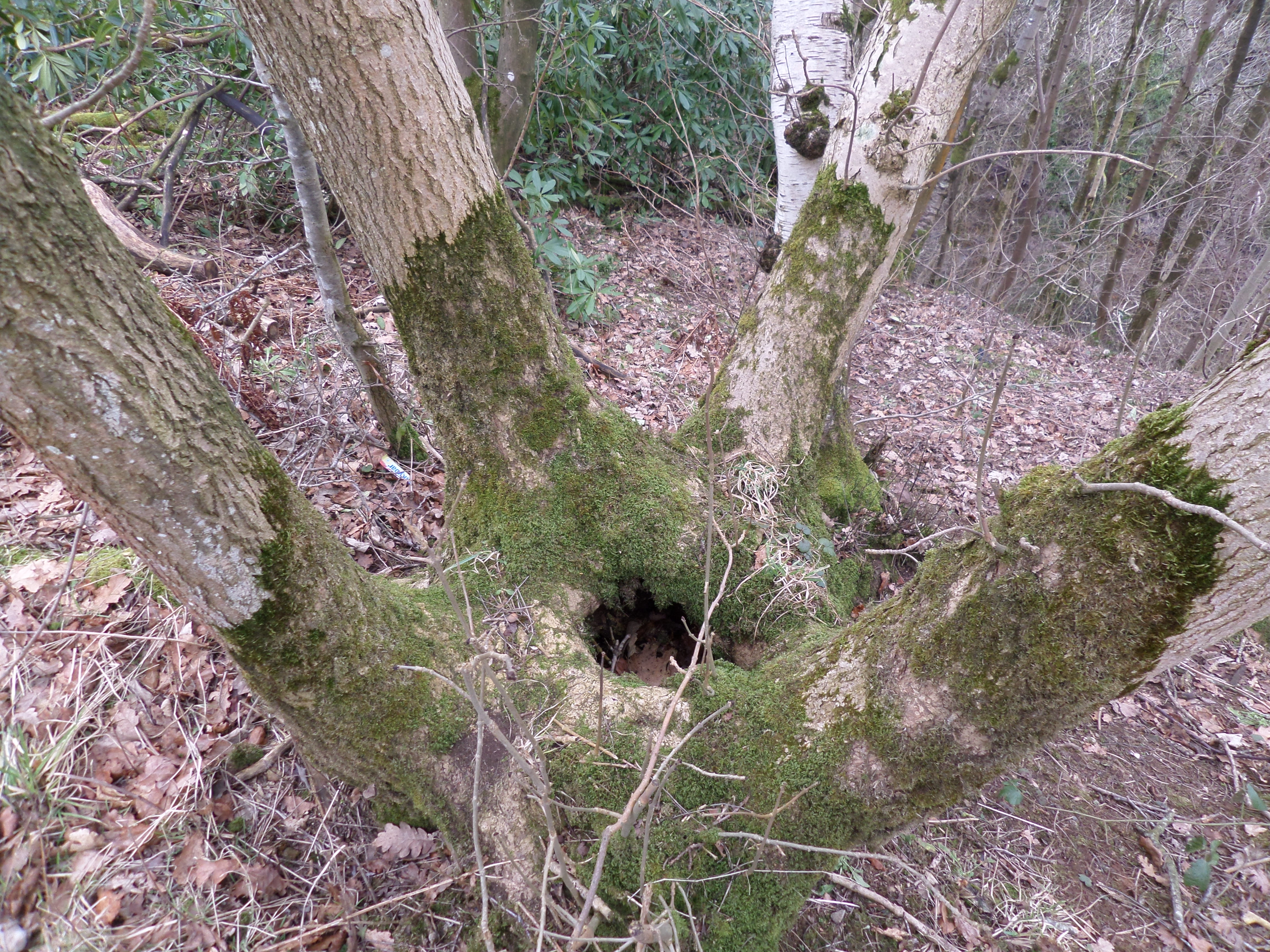
Ash coppice stool

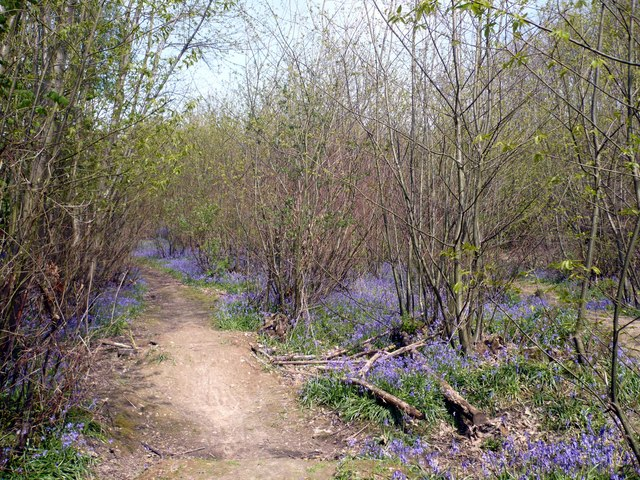
Bluebells among coppice in Bysing Wood, Kent

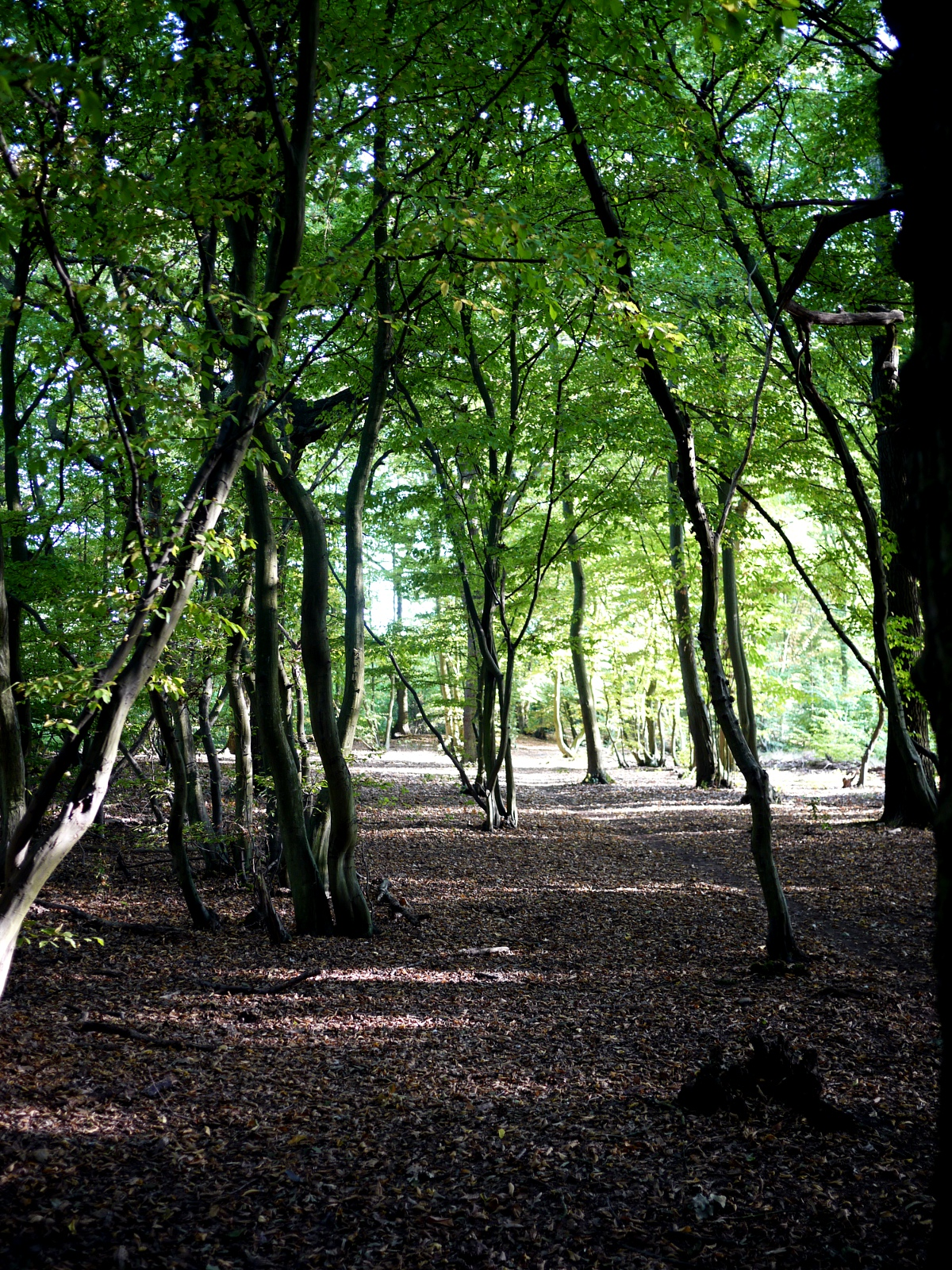
Hornbeam coppice, Pond Wood, Essex

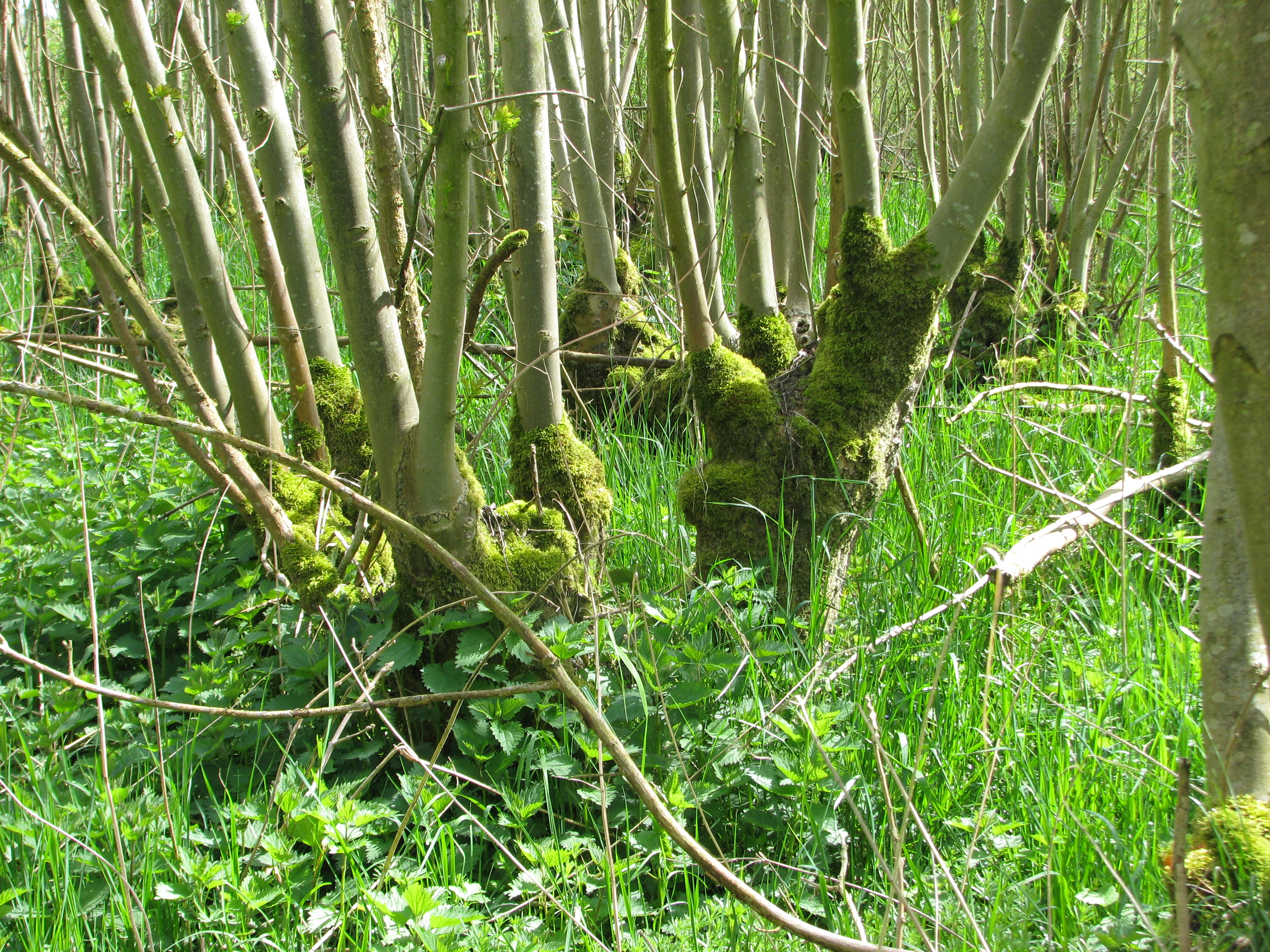
Ash coppice in Overlangbroek, Netherlands

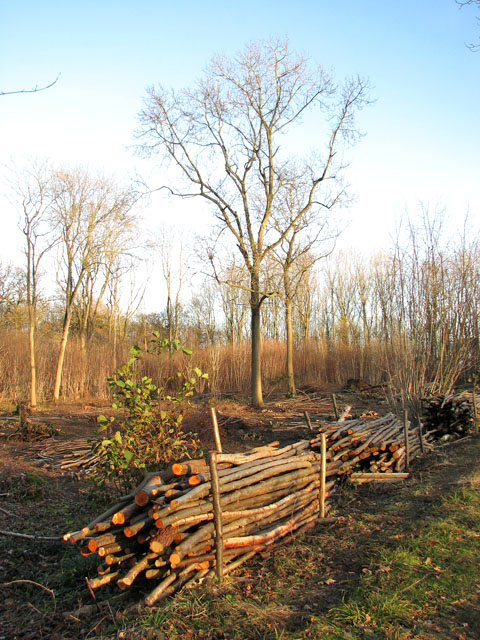
Coppicing in progress, note standard trees among the coppice stools, Lower Wood, Norfolk

== See also ==
- Ancient woodland
- Apical dominance
- Basal shoot
- Bodging
- Coarse woody debris
- Crown sprouting
- Epicormic shoot
- Even aged timber management
- Fire ecology
- Layering
- Lignotuber
- Mallee (habit)
- Pollarding
- Pruning
  - Fruit tree pruning
- Short rotation coppice
- Shredding (tree pruning technique)
- Silvopasture
- Stand level modelling
- Thinning
- Tree topping
