= Shredding (tree-pruning technique) =

European technique of removing tree branches

Shredding is a traditional European method of tree pruning by which all side branches are removed repeatedly leaving the main trunk and top growth. In the Middle Ages the practice was common throughout Europe, but it is now rare, found mainly in central and Eastern Europe.

The purpose of shredding is to allow harvest of firewood and animal fodder while preserving a tall main trunk which may be harvested for timber at a later date.

It was formerly practiced in Britain although Oliver Rackham notes that "The medieval practice of shredding – cropping the side-branches of a tree leaving a tuft at the top – vanished from Britain long ago. Only at Haresfield (Gloucestershire) have I seen a few ancient ashes that may once have been shredded".

Another name for cutting side branches off trees, used mainly in Northern England, is snagging.

Other similar woodland management techniques include pollarding and coppicing.

== See also ==
- Woodland management
