= Pollarding =

Technique of severe pruning of trees

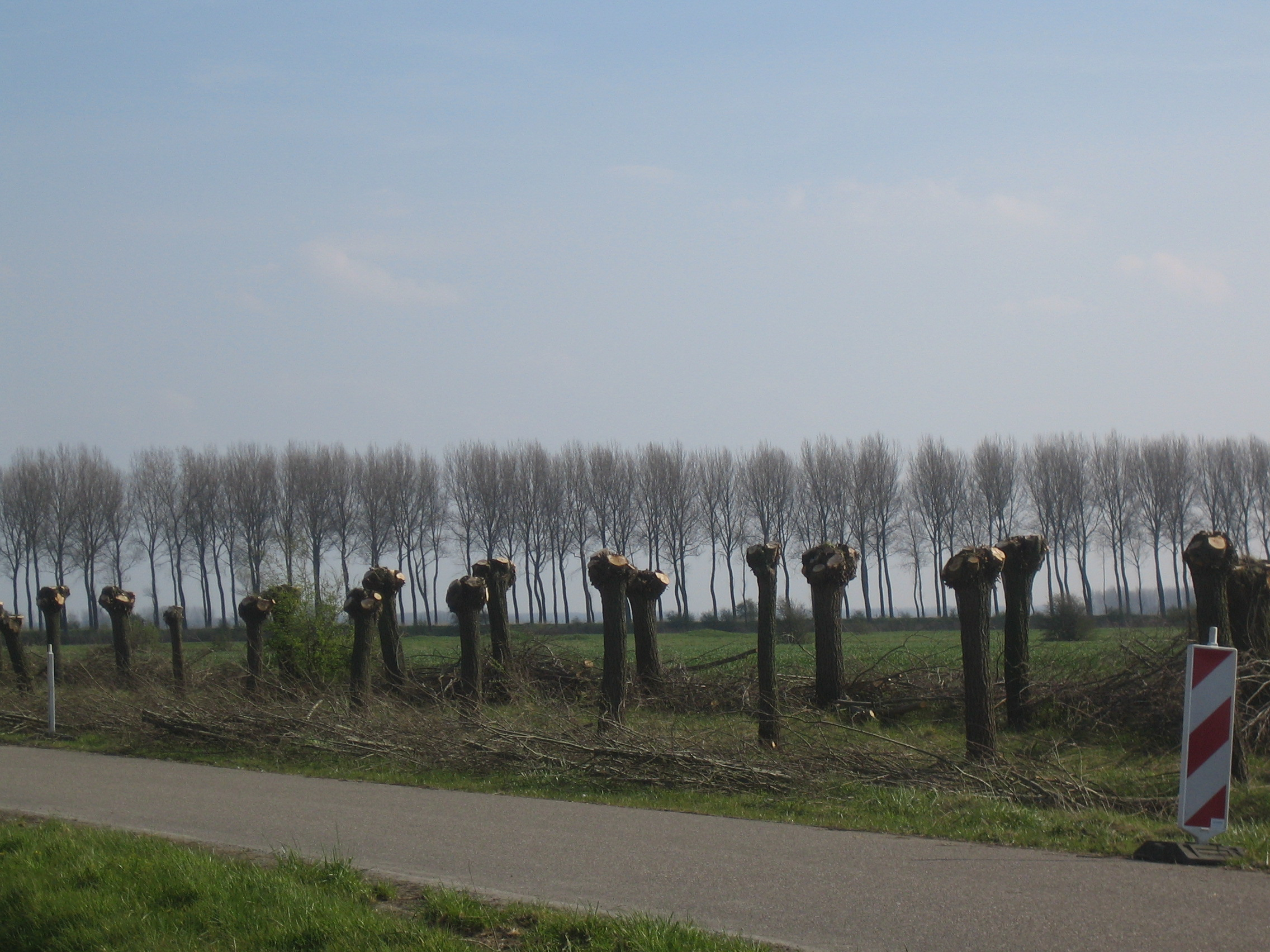
Shortly after pollarding

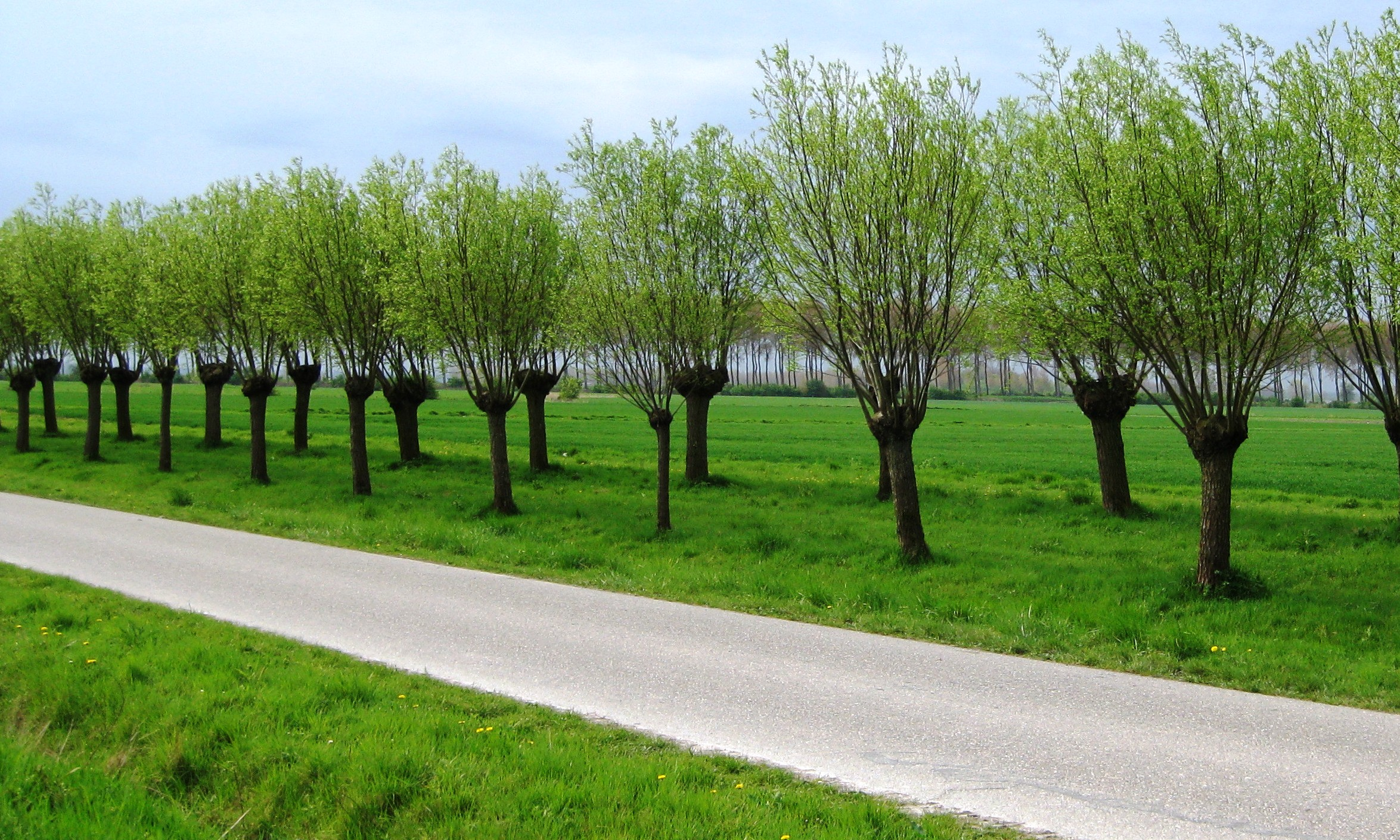
Two years after the pollarding

A line of willow pollards near Sluis, Zeeland, Netherlands.

Pollarding is a pruning system involving the removal of the upper branches of a tree, which promotes the growth of a dense head of foliage and branches. In ancient Rome, Propertius mentioned pollarding during the 1st century BCE. The practice has been common in Europe since medieval times, and today is used in urban areas worldwide, primarily to maintain trees at a determined height or to place new shoots out of the reach of grazing animals.

In the past, people pollarded trees for fodder to feed livestock or for wood. Fodder pollards produced "pollard hay" for livestock feed; they were pruned every two to six years so as to maximize the leafy material. Wood pollards were pruned every eight to fifteen years, which produced upright poles favored for fencing and boat construction. Supple young willow or hazel branches may be harvested as material for weaving baskets, fences, and garden constructions such as bowers. Nowadays, the practice is sometimes used for ornamental trees, such as crape myrtles in southern states of the US.

Pollarding tends to make trees live longer by maintaining them in a partially juvenile state, and by reducing the weight of the top part of the tree and thus its vulnerability to wind. Older pollards often become hollow, so it can be difficult to determine age accurately. Pollards tend to grow slowly, with denser growth-rings in the years immediately after cutting.

== Practice ==
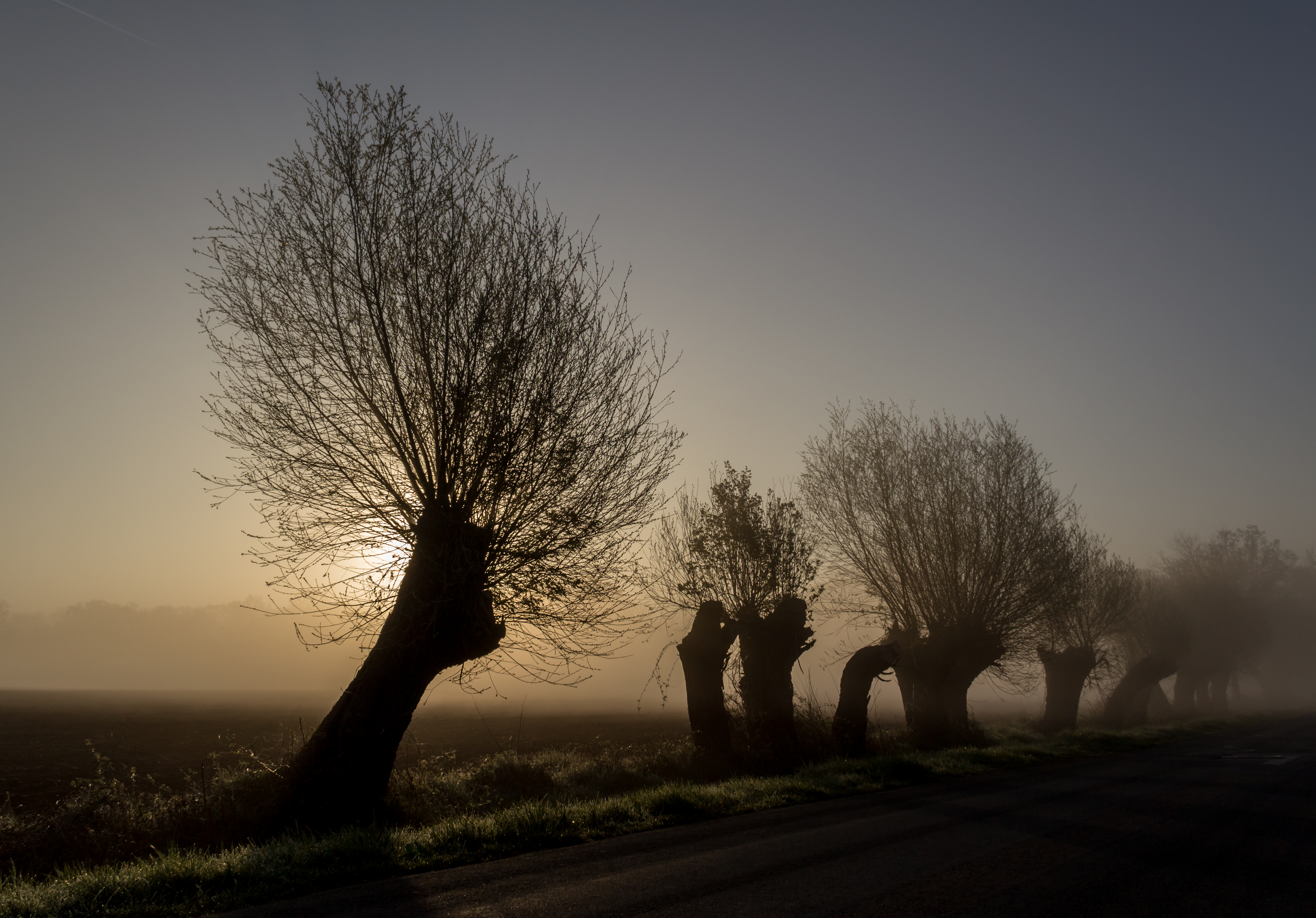
A line of pollarded willows in Germany

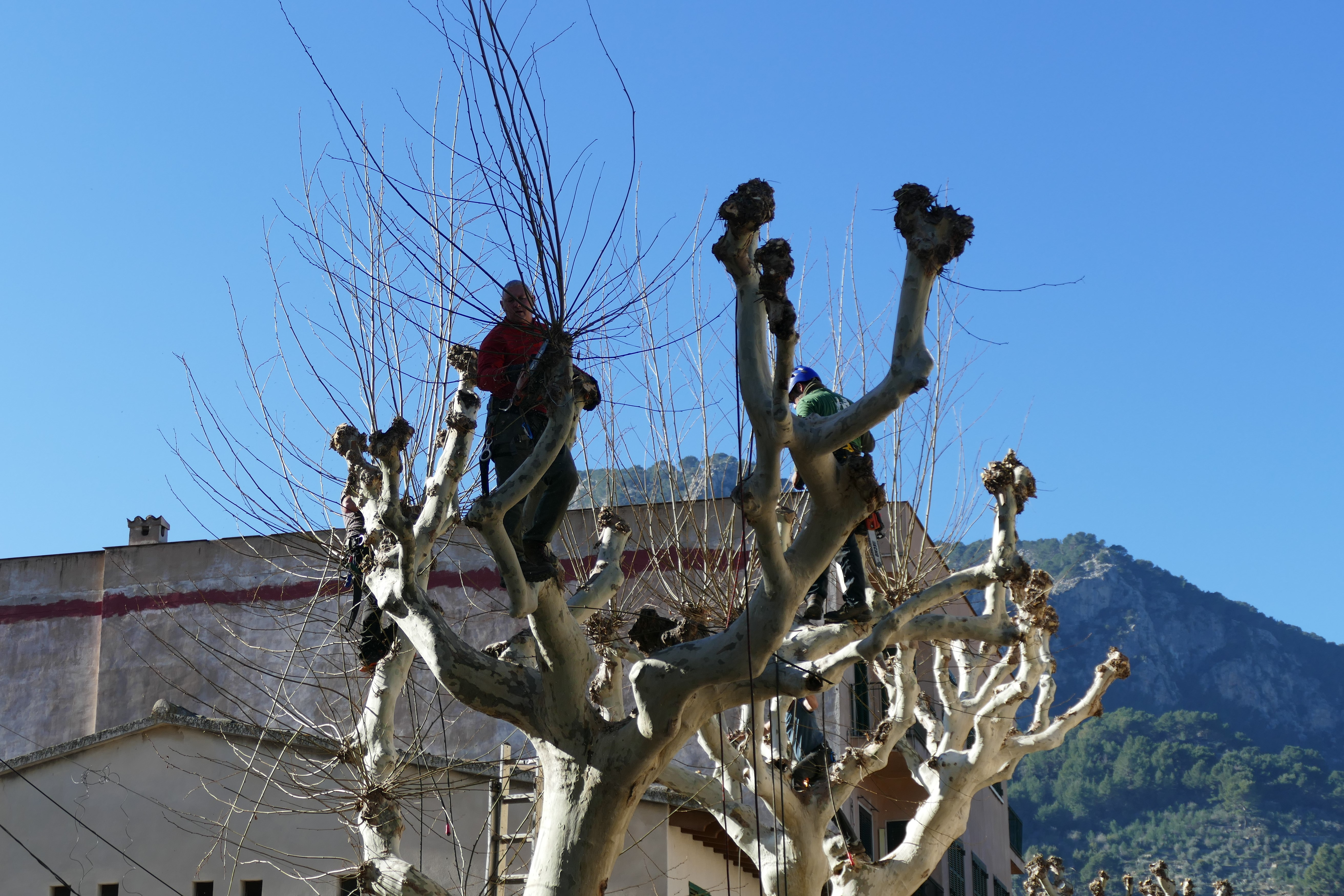
Pollarding of plane trees on Mallorca, Spain

As in coppicing, pollarding is to encourage the tree to produce new growth on a regular basis to maintain a supply of new wood for various purposes, particularly for fuel. In some areas, dried leafy branches are stored as winter fodder for stock. Depending on the use of the cut material, the length of time between cutting will vary from one year for tree hay or withies, to five years or more for larger timber. Sometimes, only some of the regrown stems may be cut in a season – this is thought to reduce the chances of death of the tree when recutting long-neglected pollards.

Pollarding was preferred over coppicing in wood-pastures and other grazed areas, because animals would browse the regrowth from coppice stools. Historically in England, the right to pollard or "lop" was often granted to local people for fuel on common land or in royal forests; this was part of the right of estover.

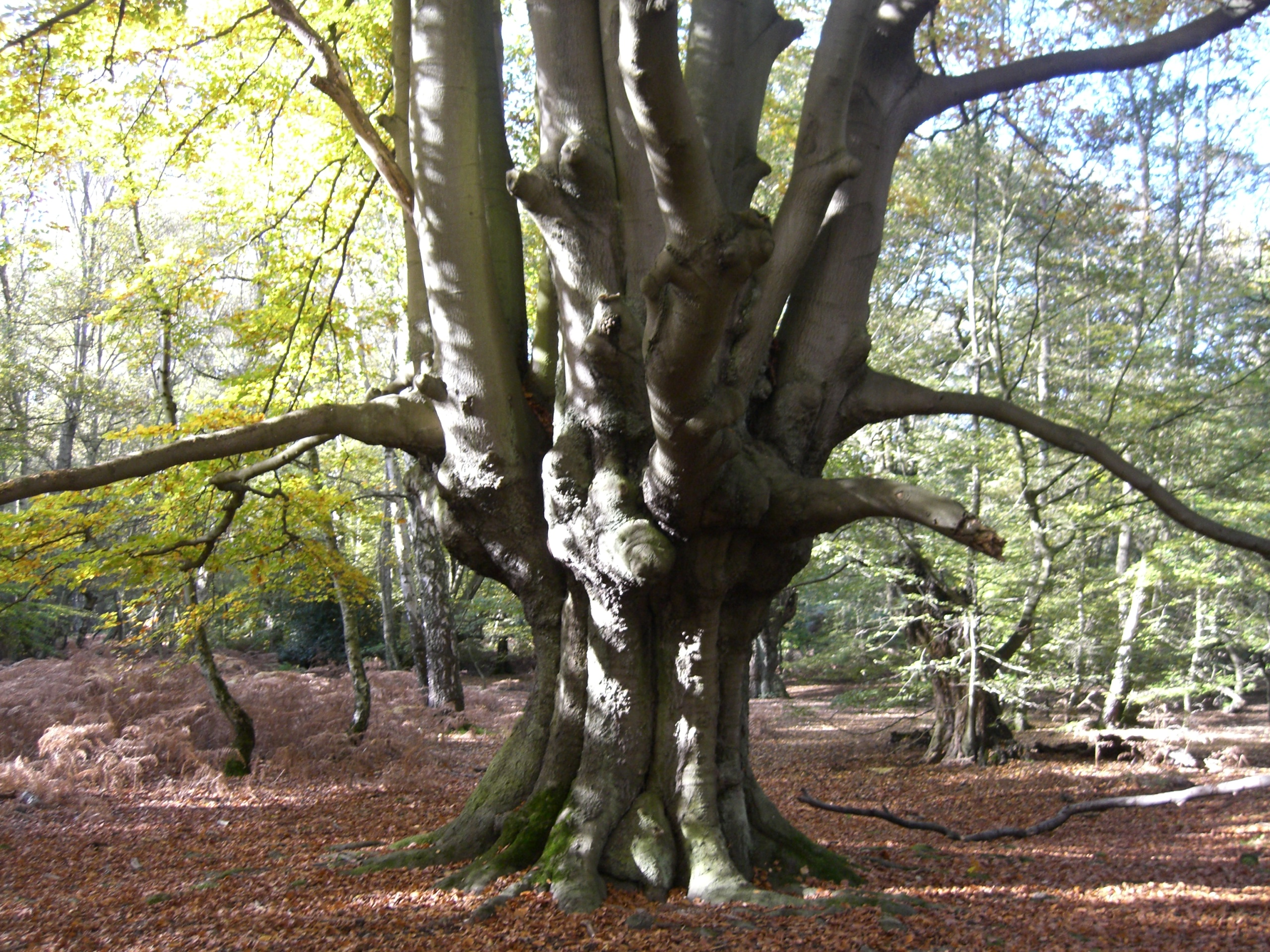
Ancient pollarded beech tree in Epping Forest, Essex, England

An incidental effect of pollarding in woodland is the encouragement of underbrush growth due to increased light reaching the woodland floor. This can increase species diversity. However, in woodland where pollarding was once common but has now ceased, the opposite effect occurs, as the side and top shoots develop into trunk-sized branches. An example of this can be seen in Epping Forest, which is within both London and Essex, UK, the majority of which was pollarded until the late 19th century. Here, the light that reaches the woodland floor is limited owing to the thick growth of the pollarded trees.

Pollards cut at about a metre above the ground are called stubs (or stubbs). These were often used as markers in coppice or other woodland. Stubs cannot be used where the trees are browsed by animals, as the regrowing shoots are below the browse line.

== Species ==
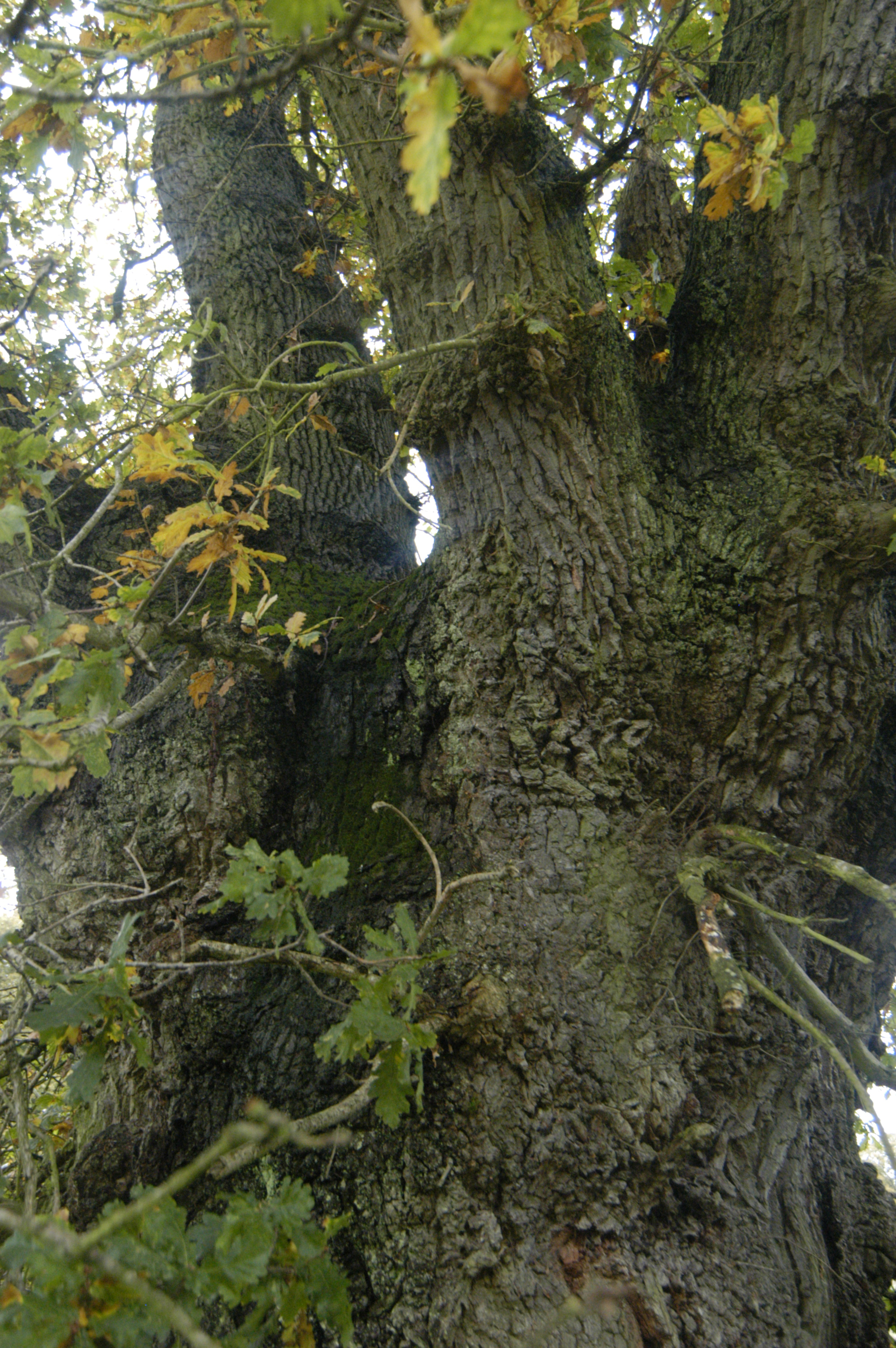
Oak pollard marking part of the ancient parish boundary of Wash Common, part of Newbury, and Sandleford, UK

As with coppicing, only species with vigorous epicormic growth may be pollarded. In these species (which include many broadleaved trees but few conifers), removal of the main apical stems releases the growth of many dormant buds under the bark on the lower part of the tree. Trees without this growth will die without their leaves and branches. Some smaller tree species do not readily form pollards, because cutting the main stem stimulates growth from the base, effectively forming a coppice stool instead. Examples of trees that do well as pollards include broadleaves such as beeches (Fagus), oaks (Quercus), maples (Acer), black locust or false acacia (Robinia pseudoacacia), hornbeams (Carpinus), lindens and limes (Tilia), planes (Platanus), horse chestnuts (Aesculus), mulberries (Morus), Eastern redbud (Cercis canadensis), tree of heaven (Ailanthus altissima), willows (Salix), and a few conifers, such as yews (Taxus).

Pollarding is also used in urban forestry in certain areas for reasons such as tree size management, safety, and health concerns. It removes rotting or diseased branches to support the overall health of the tree and removes living and dead branches that could harm property and people, as well as increasing the amount of foliage in spring for aesthetic, shade and air quality reasons. Some trees may be rejuvenated by pollarding – for example, Bradford pear (Pyrus calleryana 'Bradford'), a flowering species that becomes brittle and top-heavy when older.

Oaks, when very old, can form new trunks from the growth of pollard branches; that is, surviving branches which have split away from the main trunk naturally.

In Japan, Daisugi is practiced on Cryptomeria. The technique is used in Africa for moringa trees to bring the nutritious leaves into easier reach for harvesting.

== Ecological impact ==
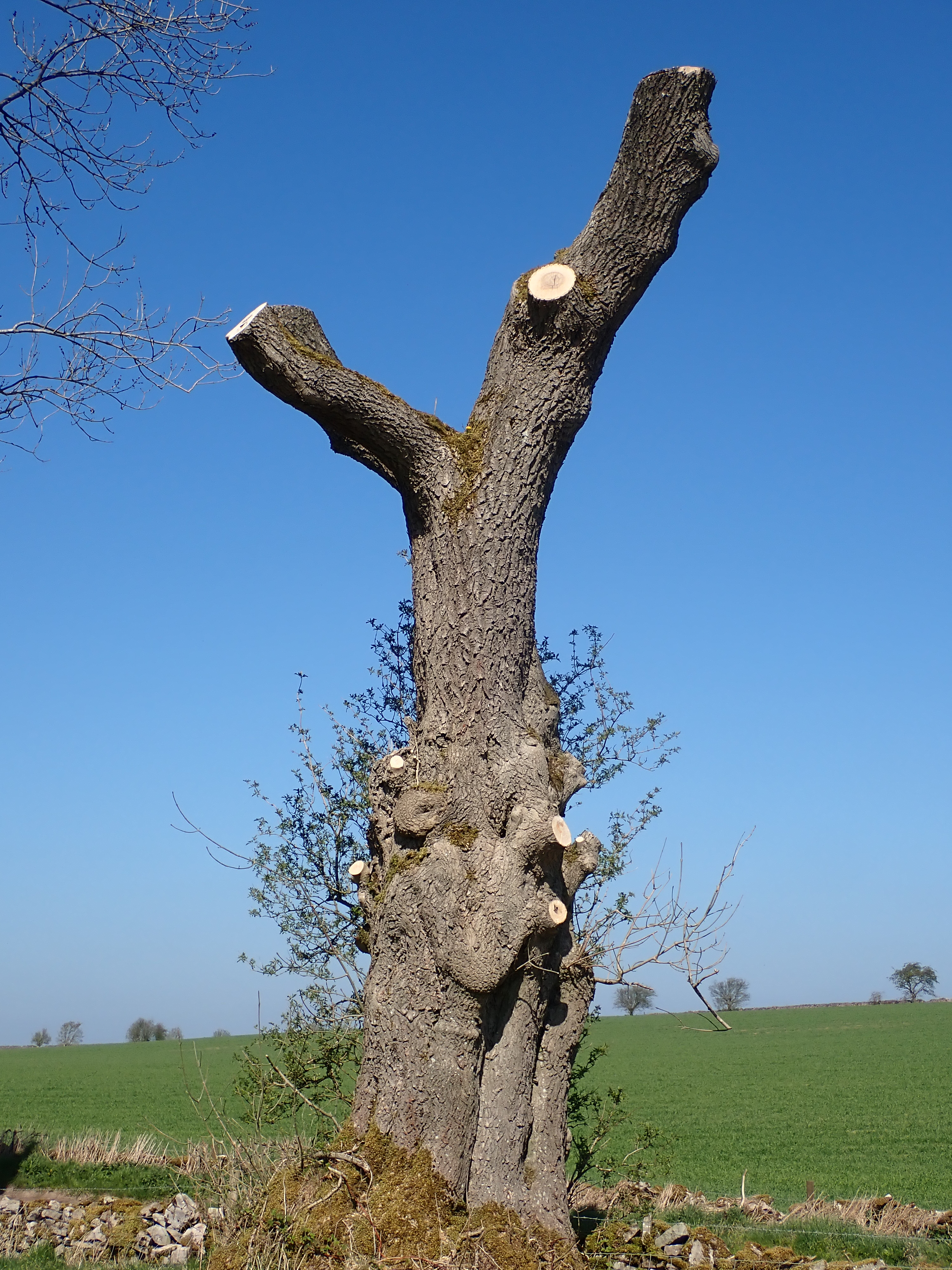
A recently pollarded tree.

Pollarding trees reduces the tree canopy and allows more light penetration and therefore better light availability for the understory vegetation growing below. This can have a beneficial impact on the forest floor by encouraging plant biodiversity in an area where light availability was originally scarce. The practice of pollarding is also known to promote the formation of tree hollows and rot holes, with pollarded trees being substantially more likely to form hollows than unpollarded trees. Thousands of species of insect rely on the saproxylic habitat that pollarded trees can provide. Many species of hoverfly and beetle will utilize the hollows and rot holes that form in living trees for their habitat. These tree hollows can provide a habitat to a wide variety of saproxylic lichens, mosses and fungi species. The tree cavities that form can be used by both birds and bats as roost and nest sites. The pollarding of trees is often used for conservation purposes to both enhance biodiversity and provide habitat diversity.

== Origin and usage of term ==
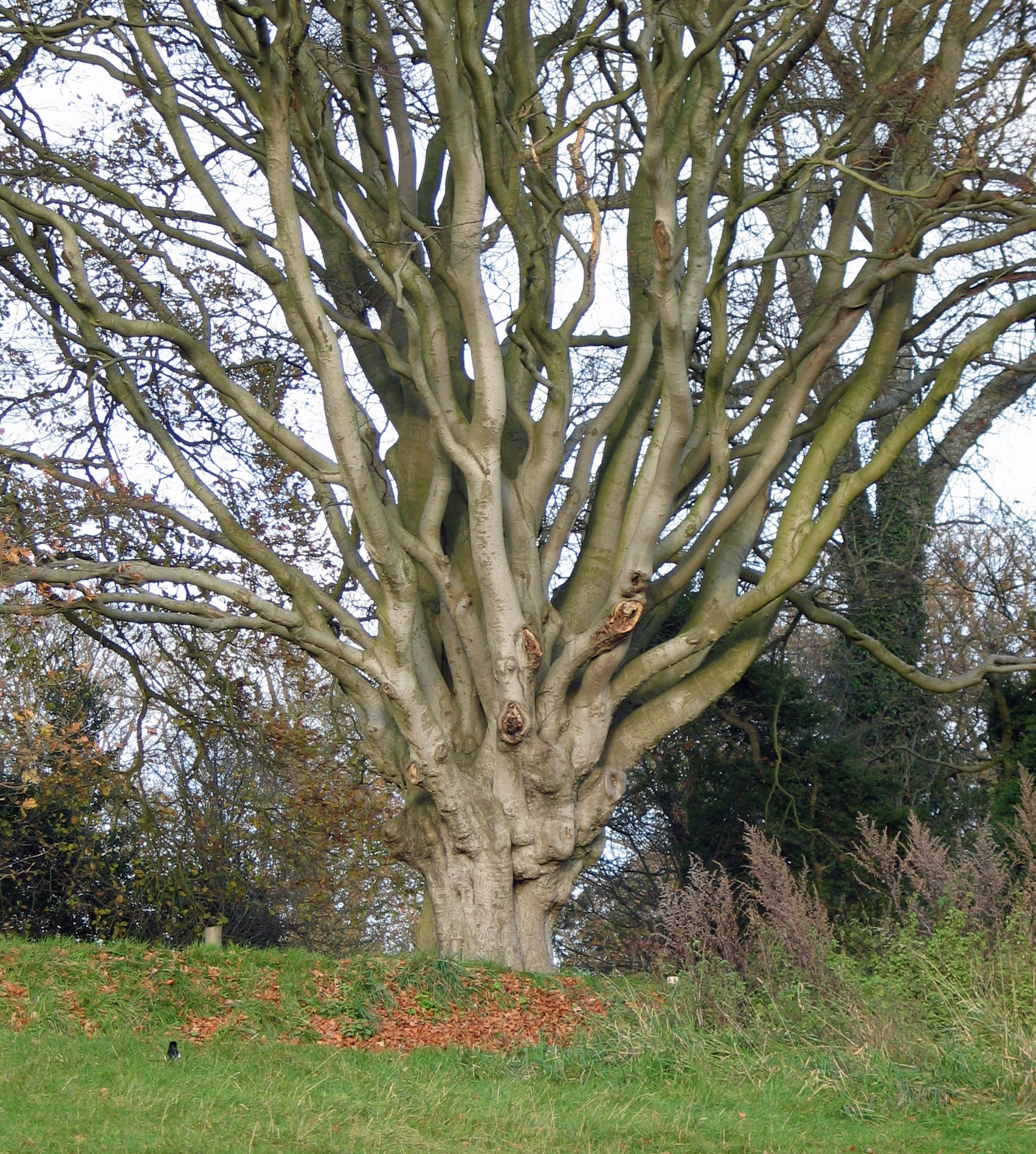
Ancient beech pollard, Box Hill, Surrey, UK. (Note: The tree marks the boundary between two parishes: Mickleham (to the north) and Dorking (to the south).)

"Poll" was originally a name for the top of the head (hence poll tax and the like), and "to poll" was a verb meaning 'to crop the hair'. This use was extended to similar treatment of the branches of trees and the horns of animals. A pollard simply meant someone or something that had been polled (similar to the formation of "drunkard" and "sluggard"); for example, a hornless ox or polled livestock. Later, the noun "pollard" came to be used as a verb: "pollarding". Pollarding has now largely replaced polling as the verb in the forestry sense. Pollard can also be used as an adjective: "pollard tree".

== See also ==
- Bonsai
- Coppicing
- Daisugi
- Fruit tree pruning
- Pleaching
- Shredding (tree-pruning technique)
- Tree topping
