= Daisugi =

Traditional Japanese forestry technique

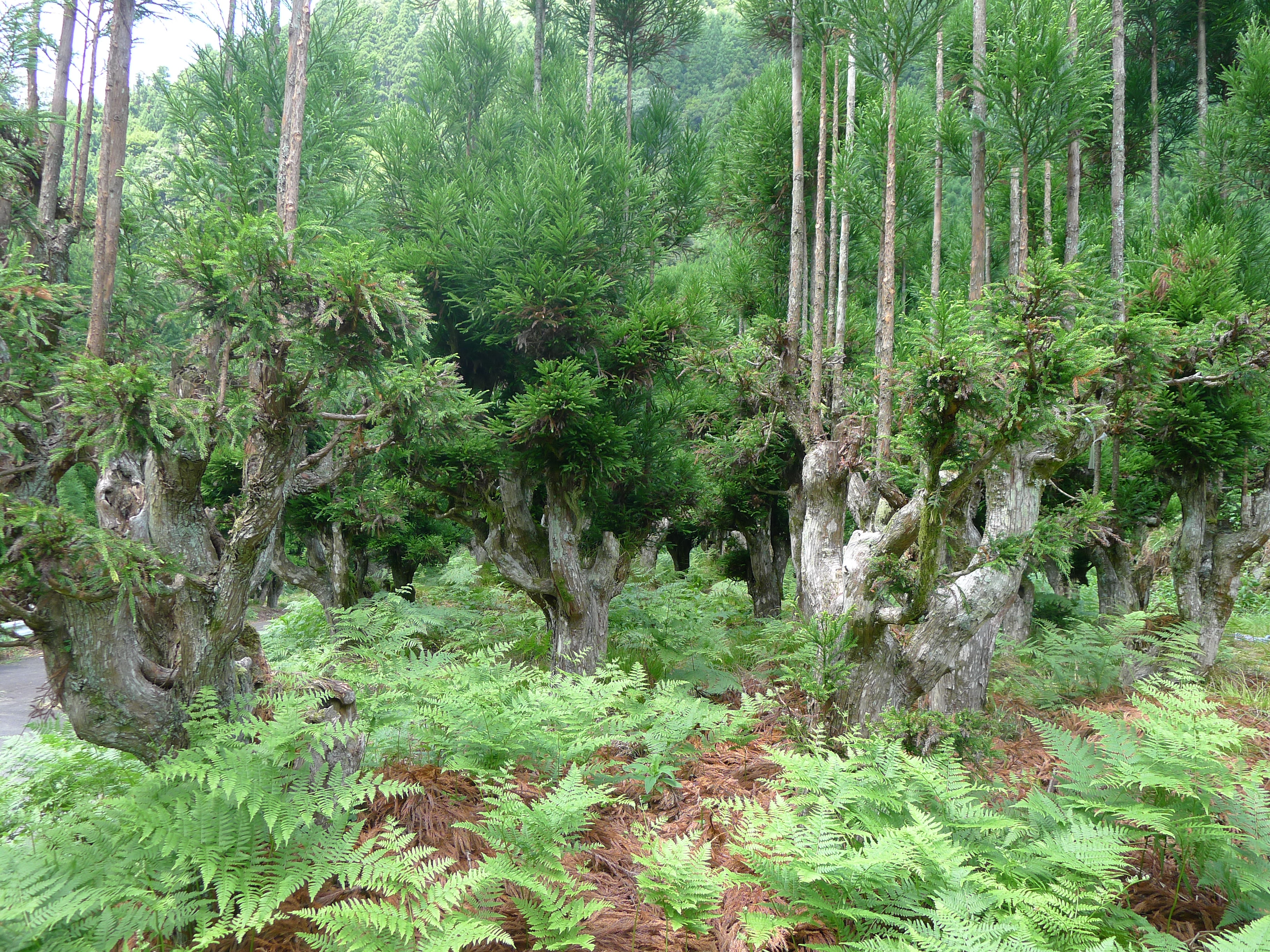
Daisugi trees

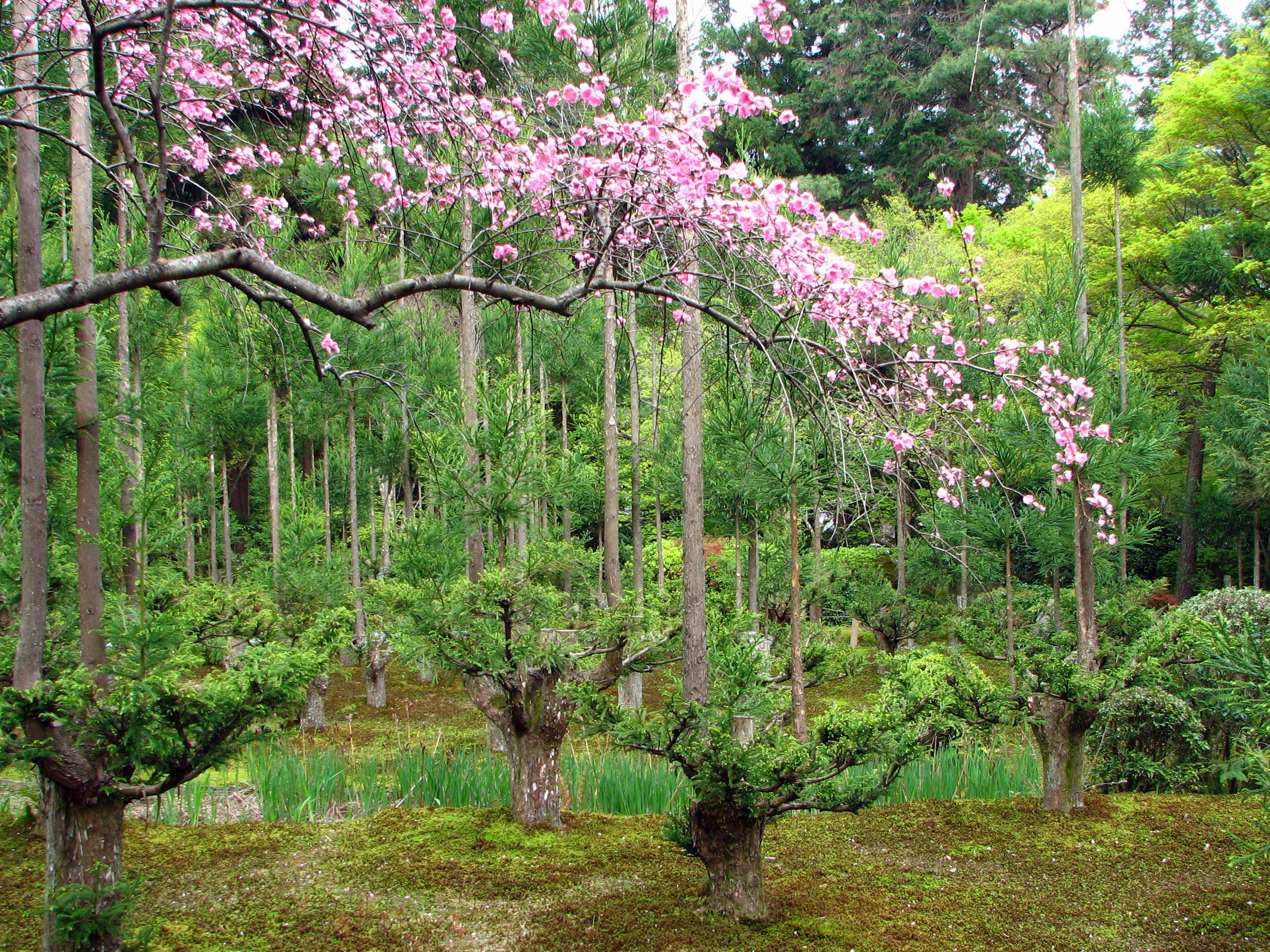
Daisugi trees at Ryōan-ji

Daisugi (台杉) is a Japanese technique related to pollarding, used on Cryptomeria (sugi) trees. The term roughly translates to 'platform cedar'.

When applied in a silviculture context, the daisugi method requires trunks to be pruned every 2–4 years to maintain the straight, clear grain for which they are coveted.

== History ==
In the Muromachi period, a very straight and stylized form of Sukiya-zukuri architecture was highly fashionable in Japan, leading to increased demand for straight, uniform logs. As a response, the daisugi method was developed by foresters in the Kitayama area of Kyoto, though other forms of vegetative reproduction such as the propagation of cuttings remained the dominant afforestation technique across the country.

Kitayama foresters increased the value of their daisugi logs by applying a unique sand polishing method that gave the wood a smooth, shiny finish. The development of the sanding method is attributed to a local fable about a traveling monk who was cared for by Kitayama villagers; it is said that he repaid their kindness by sharing his forestry knowledge with them. Due to their strength and aesthetic value, Kitayama's daisugi logs, and similar specialty lumber such as Kitayama Maruta logs became popular in tea room construction, such as the tokonoma alcove.

== Modern practice ==
Although originally a forestry management technique, daisugi has also been adopted in Japanese gardens as an aesthetic feature.

Examples of daisugi forestry can still be found in northern Kyoto, where it was developed, though Kitayama sugi plantations do not contribute significantly to the domestic lumber market as they once did. In the Village of Nakagawa in the Kyoto prefecture, efforts are underway to preserve traditional Japanese sugi silviculture practices such as daisugi, and the sand polishing technique used to finish daisugi logs.
