= Epicormic shoot =

Plant shoot growing from an epicormic bud

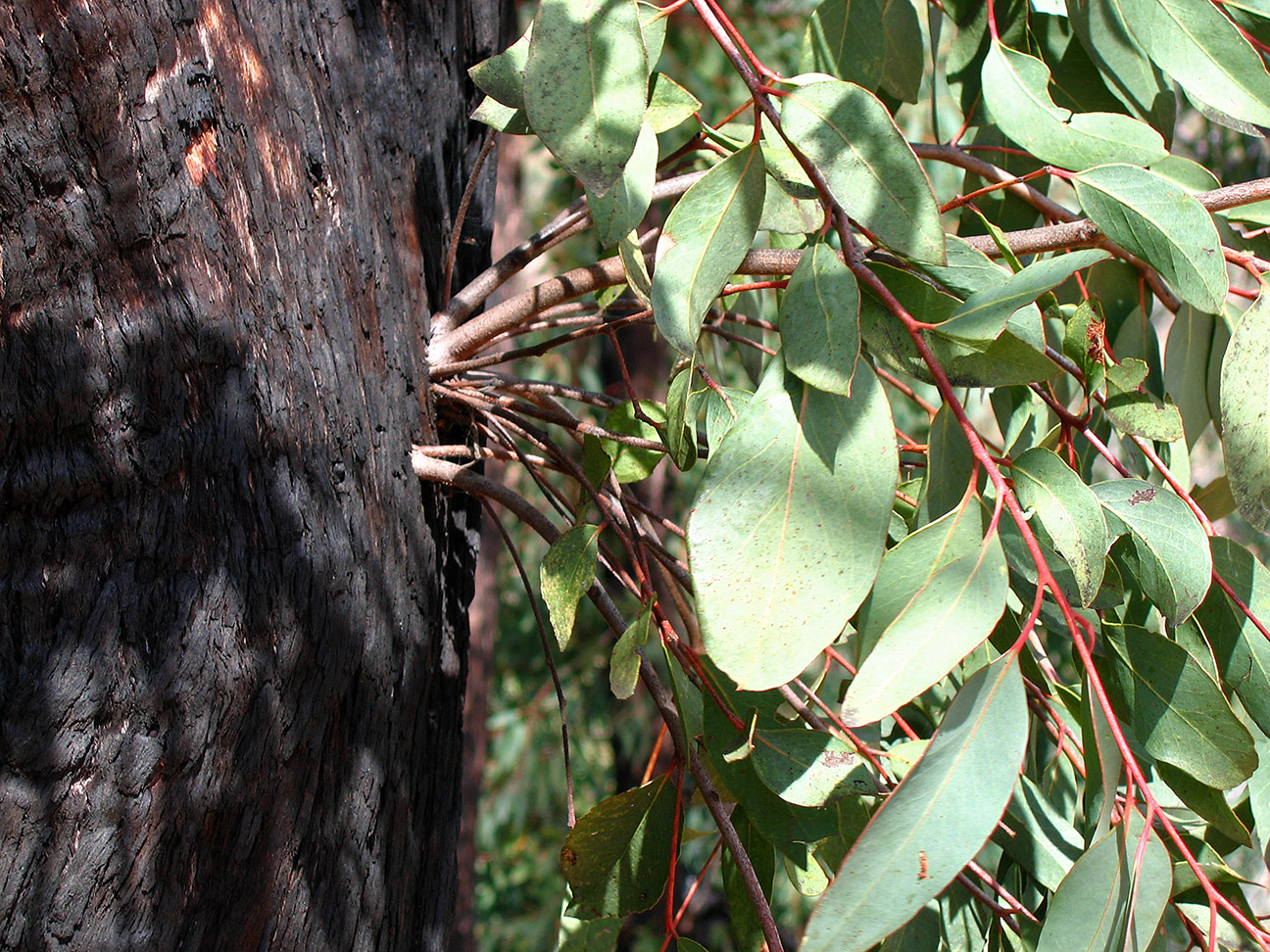
Epicormic shoots sprouting vigorously from epicormic buds beneath the bushfire damaged bark on the trunk of a Eucalyptus tree

An epicormic shoot is a shoot growing from an epicormic bud, which lies underneath the bark of a trunk, stem, or branch of a plant.

Epicormic buds lie dormant beneath the bark, their growth suppressed by hormones from active shoots higher up the plant. Under certain conditions, they grow into active shoots, such as when damage occurs to higher parts of the plant, or light levels are increased following removal of nearby plants. Epicormic buds and shoots occur in many woody species, but are absent from many others, such as most conifers.

== Function ==
Human horticultural practices that exploit epicormic growth rely on plants that have epicormic budding capabilities for regenerative function in response to crown damage, such as through wind or fire.

Epicormic shoots are the means by which trees regrow after coppicing or pollarding, where the tree's trunk or branches are cut back on a regular cycle. These forestry techniques cannot be used on species which do not possess strong epicormic growth abilities.

Pruning leads to growth of suppressed shoots below the cut – these may be from epicormic buds, but they may also be other growth, such as normal buds or small shoots which are only partly suppressed.

== Examples ==
Epicormic resprouting is typical of some tree species from fire-prone ecosystems.

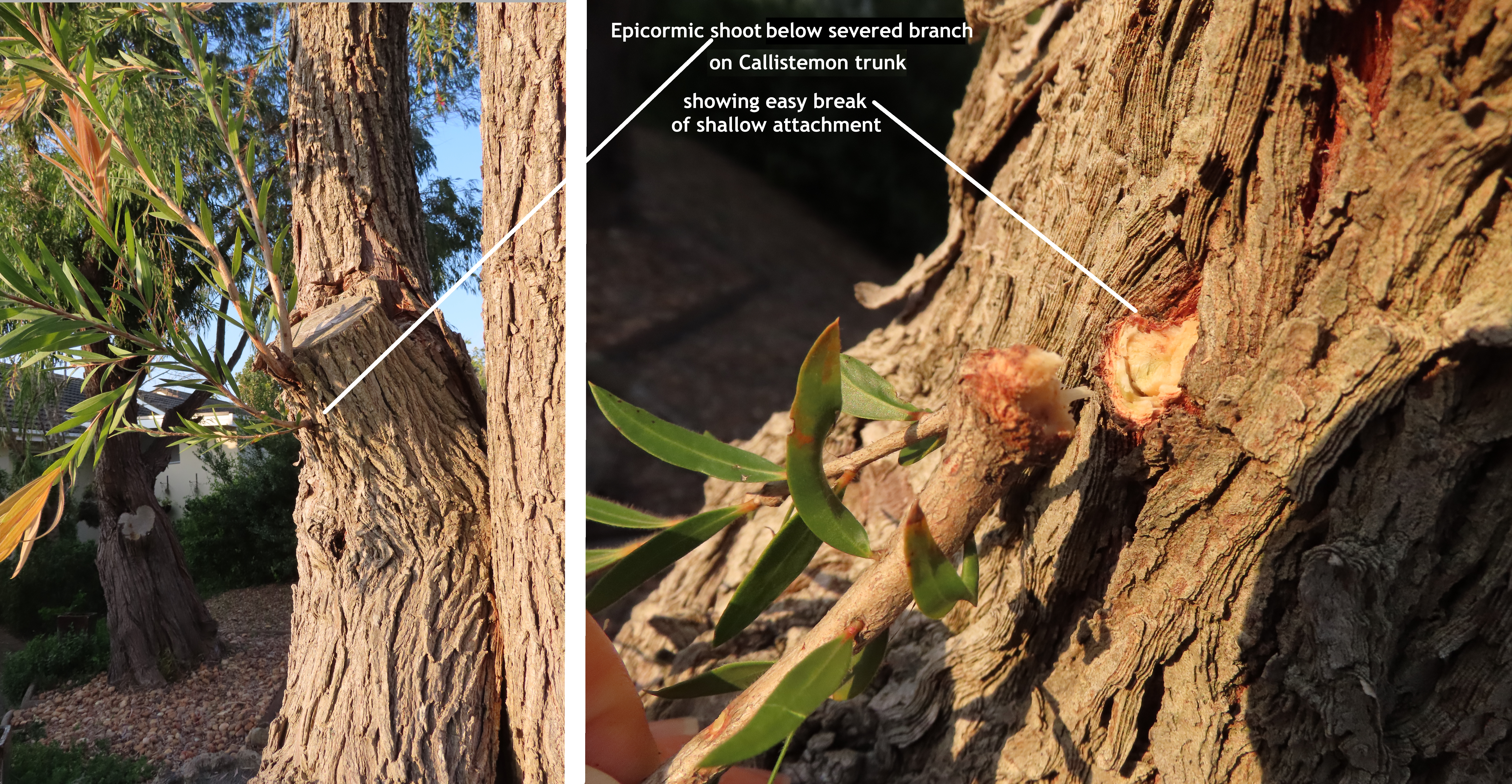
Epicormic shoot on Callistemon, showing the fragility of the attachment before the parental wood has grown thick enough to supply a deep, firm attachment

As one of their responses to frequent bushfires which would destroy most other plants, many eucalypt trees found widely throughout Australia have extensive epicormic buds which sprout following a fire, allowing the vegetative regeneration of branches from their trunks. These epicormic buds are highly protected, set deeper beneath the thick bark than in other tree species, allowing both the buds and vascular cambium to be insulated from the intense heat. Not all eucalypt trees possess this means of vegetative recovery, and the ability of a tree to survive and re-sprout depends on many factors, such as fire intensity, scorch height, and tree height, species, age, and size. Jarrah trees, found in the south-west of Western Australia, have epicormic buds which are activated after a bushfire or other extreme conditions.

The Mediterranean Quercus suber (cork oak) resprouts from epicormic buds after fire.

Dogwood trees – which are susceptible to a fungal infection known as dogwood anthracnose (Discula destructiva) – will sometimes send out epicormic shoots when they are dying from the disease. Similarly, ash trees may develop epicormic shoots when infested by the emerald ash borer.

Epicormic shoots can be used in mass propagation of oak trees.

The long-lived Pseudotsuga macrocarpa (bigcone Douglas fir) forms epicormic shoots both in response to fire damage and as a means of forming growth on existing branches. The epicormic branching pattern has been observed to six iterations.

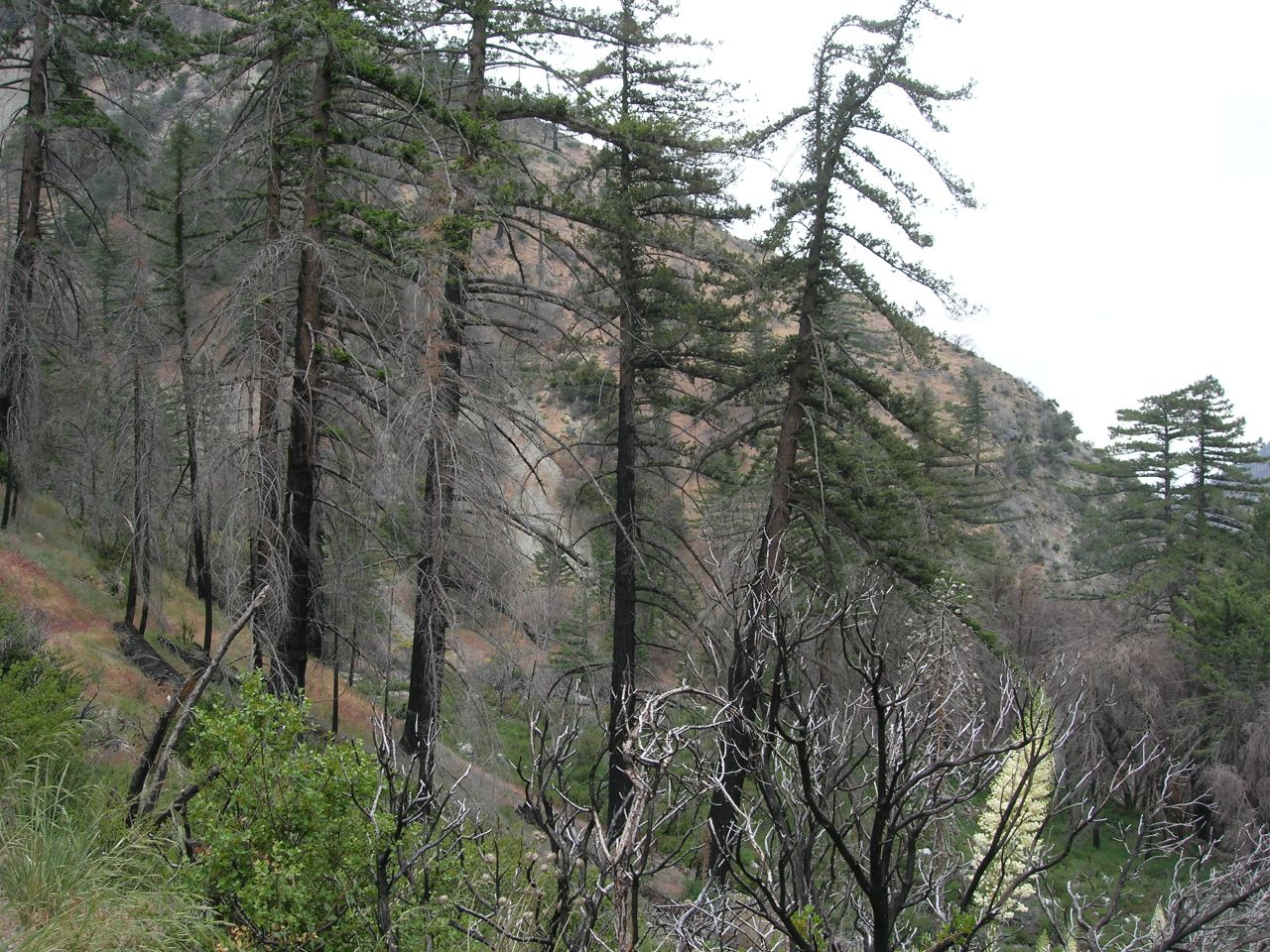
Pseudotsuga macrocarpa showing branch regeneration after a crown fire through epicormic shoots. Note the charred tree trunks.

== See also ==
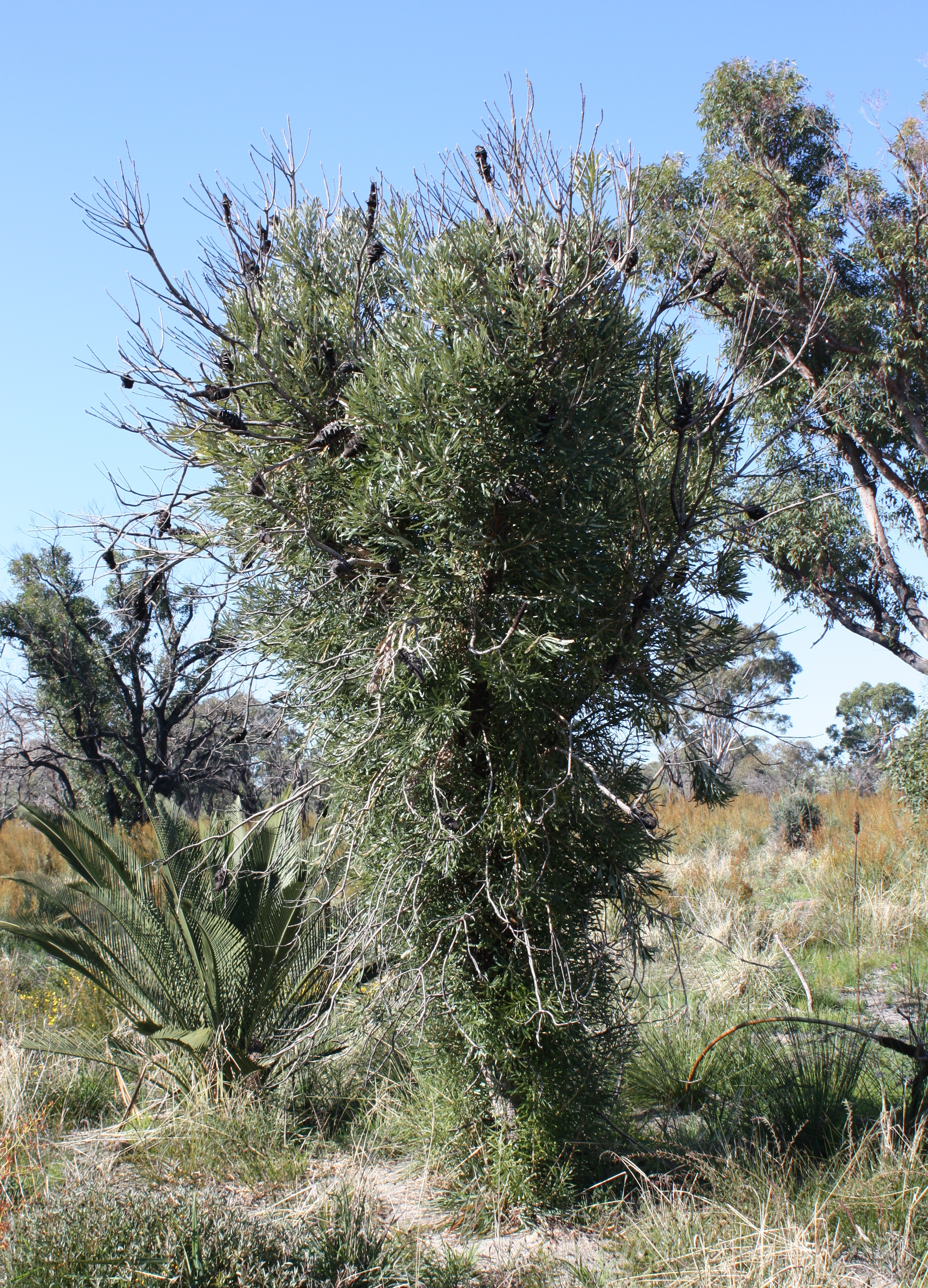
Banksia attenuata resprouting from epicormic buds following a bushfire

- Adventitiousness
- Apical dominance
- Coppicing
- Crown sprouting
- Cutting (plant)
- Lignotuber
- Plant hormone
- Pollarding
- Resprouter
- Witch's broom
