= Crown sprouting =

Crown sprouting is the ability of a plant to regenerate its shoot system after destruction (usually by fire) by activating dormant vegetative structures to produce regrowth from the root crown (the junction between the root and shoot portions of a plant). These dormant structures take the form of lignotubers or basal epicormic buds. Plant species that can accomplish crown sprouting are called crown resprouters (distinguishing them from stem or trunk resprouters) and, like them, are characteristic of fire-prone habitats such as chaparral.

In contrast to plant fire survival strategies that decrease the flammability of the plant, or by requiring heat to germinate, crown sprouting allows for the total destruction of the above ground growth. Crown sprouting plants typically have extensive root systems in which they store nutrients allowing them to survive during fires and sprout afterwards. Early researchers suggested that crown sprouting species might lack species genetic diversity; however, research on Gondwanan shrubland suggests that crown sprouting species have similar genetic diversity to seed sprouters. Some genera, such as Arctostaphylos and Ceanothus, have species that are both resprouters and not, both adapted to fire.

California Buckeye, Aesculus californica, is an example of a western United States tree which can regenerate from its root crown after a fire event, but can also regenerate by seed.

== See also ==
- Fire ecology
- Lignotuber
