= Urban forestry =

Care of trees in urban environments

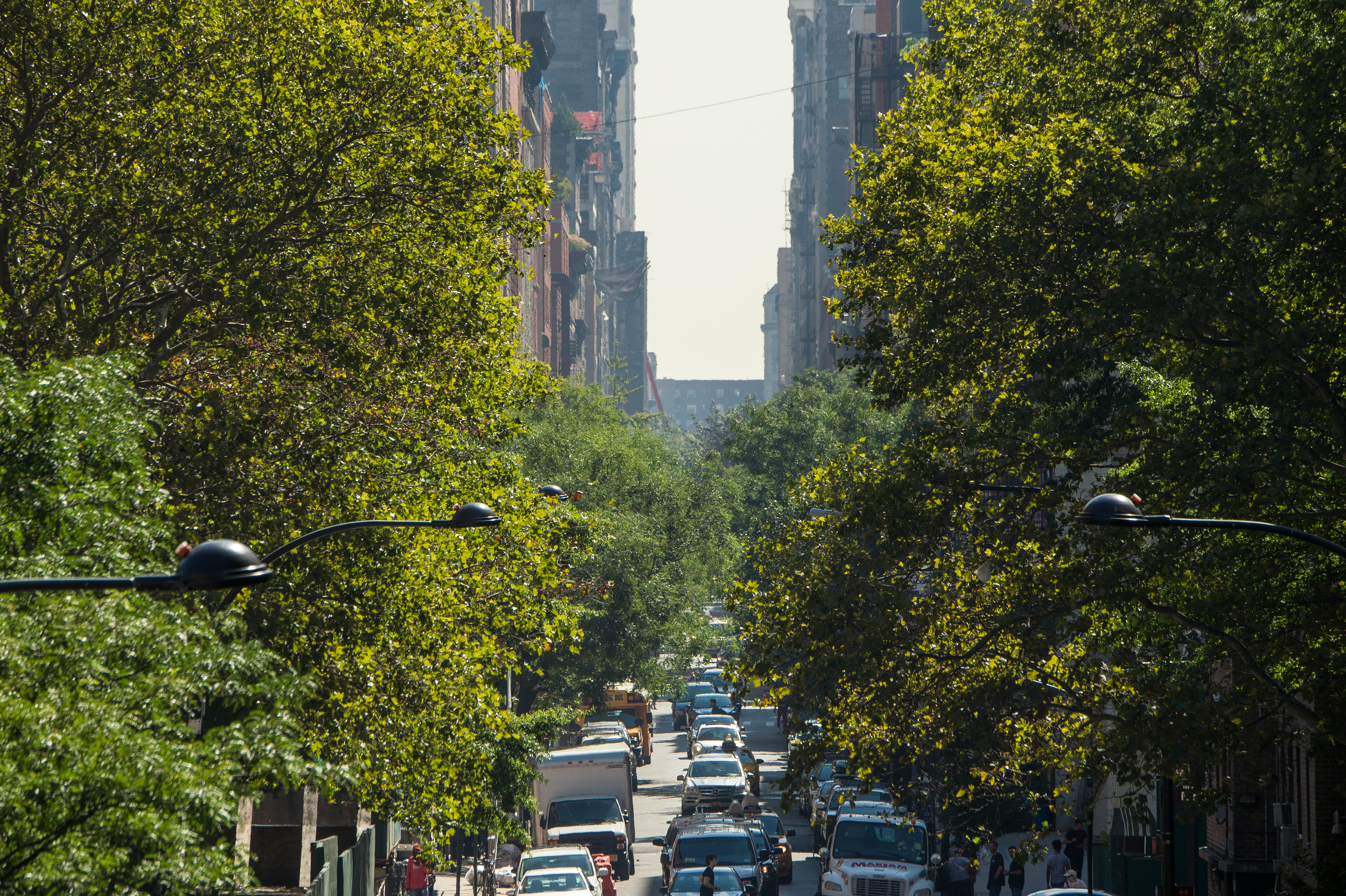
Urban forestry in New York City

Urban forestry is the care and management of single trees and tree populations in urban settings for the purpose of improving the urban environment. Also called urban tree canopy, urban forestry involves both planning and management, including the programming of care and maintenance operations of the urban forest.

Urban forestry advocates the role of trees as a critical part of the urban infrastructure. Urban foresters plant and maintain trees, support appropriate tree and forest preservation, conduct research and promote the many benefits trees provide. Urban forestry is practiced by municipal and commercial arborists, municipal and utility foresters, environmental policymakers, city planners, consultants, educators, researchers and community activists. Urban forests mitigate the effects of urban heat island through evapotranspiration and the shading of streets and buildings.

There are many environmental impacts that are associated with the inequity of the urban tree canopy. Strategically, planting trees is a proven method of climate change adaptation and mitigation. Wildlife is also attracted to urban forests for their increased surface waters due to reduced runoff in these areas. Forests that have been included in urban environments have shown beneficial effects for the residents who live there. Urban forestry has been shown to promote psychological healing, stress recovery, and to improve concentration and productivity. Street trees, if managed and cared for, are beneficial in creating sustainable and healthy communities. The inequitable distribution of canopy cover in lower socioeconomic neighborhoods has resulted in many social impacts that raise environmental justice concerns.

== Benefits ==
=== Environmental and health impacts ===
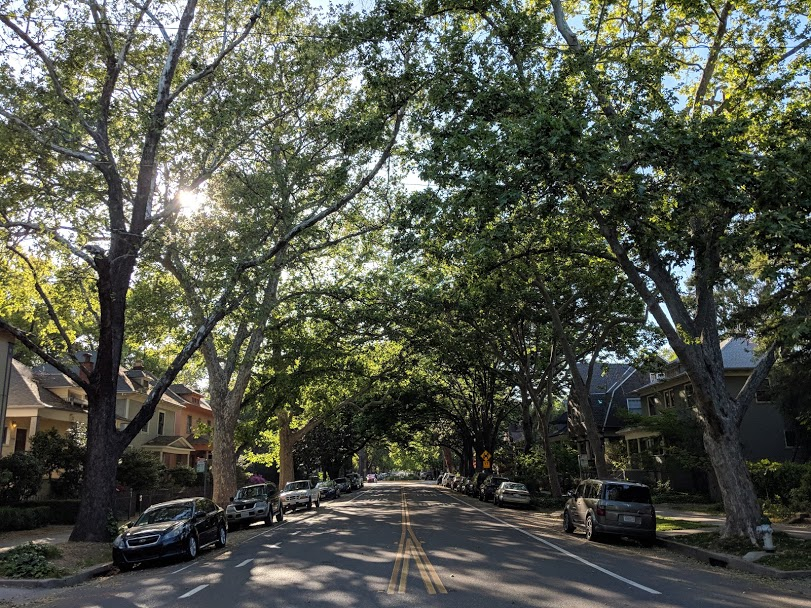
Tree canopy over Midtown Sacramento suburban street

Heat waves cause 1,300 deaths each year in the United States alone, which is more than any other weather-related event. As temperatures continue to rise due to global warming, we can expect to see this number increasing in coming years. The risk is exacerbated for low-income households who do not have access to air conditioning, as well as heat-sensitive populations such as the elderly, infants, and those who have chronic health problems.

Reforesting a 10-meter radius corresponds to 0.7 degree Celsius decrease in daytime air temperature, compared to a 1.3 degree decrease in a 30-meter radius, and over 1.5 degrees in a 60 or 90 meter radius. This reduces the risk of heat stroke, decreases cooling costs, and improves general well-being.

A review in 2024 that contained 182 studies across 110 cities and regions discorvered that urban trees can lower pedestrian-level temperatures by up to 12 degrees Celsius by shading and transpiration.

Trees have saved 1,200 lives annually in the U.S., by preventing heat related deaths. Urban forests improve air quality by absorbing pollutants such as ozone, nitrogen dioxide, ammonia, and particulate matter as well as performing carbon sequestration. Communities with better air quality measures demonstrate lower levels of childhood asthma. Urban forestry can be an important tool for stormwater management as trees intercept rainwater in the canopy, and can slow down, filter and pump water back into the atmosphere via their roots. In 2025 a systematic review of 115 studies found that urban trees generally provide greater cooling benefits which is better than other types of vegetation. The effectiveness of this cooling varies depending on climate, tree characteristics, and planting arrangements.Other benefits include noise control, traffic control, and glare and reflection control.

A 2024 study of sidewalks in Tacoma, Washington found that locations without a tree canopy within 10 meters from each other were up to 5 times more likely to exceed high temperature thresholds compared to locations with full canopy covering distance.

=== Mental health impacts ===
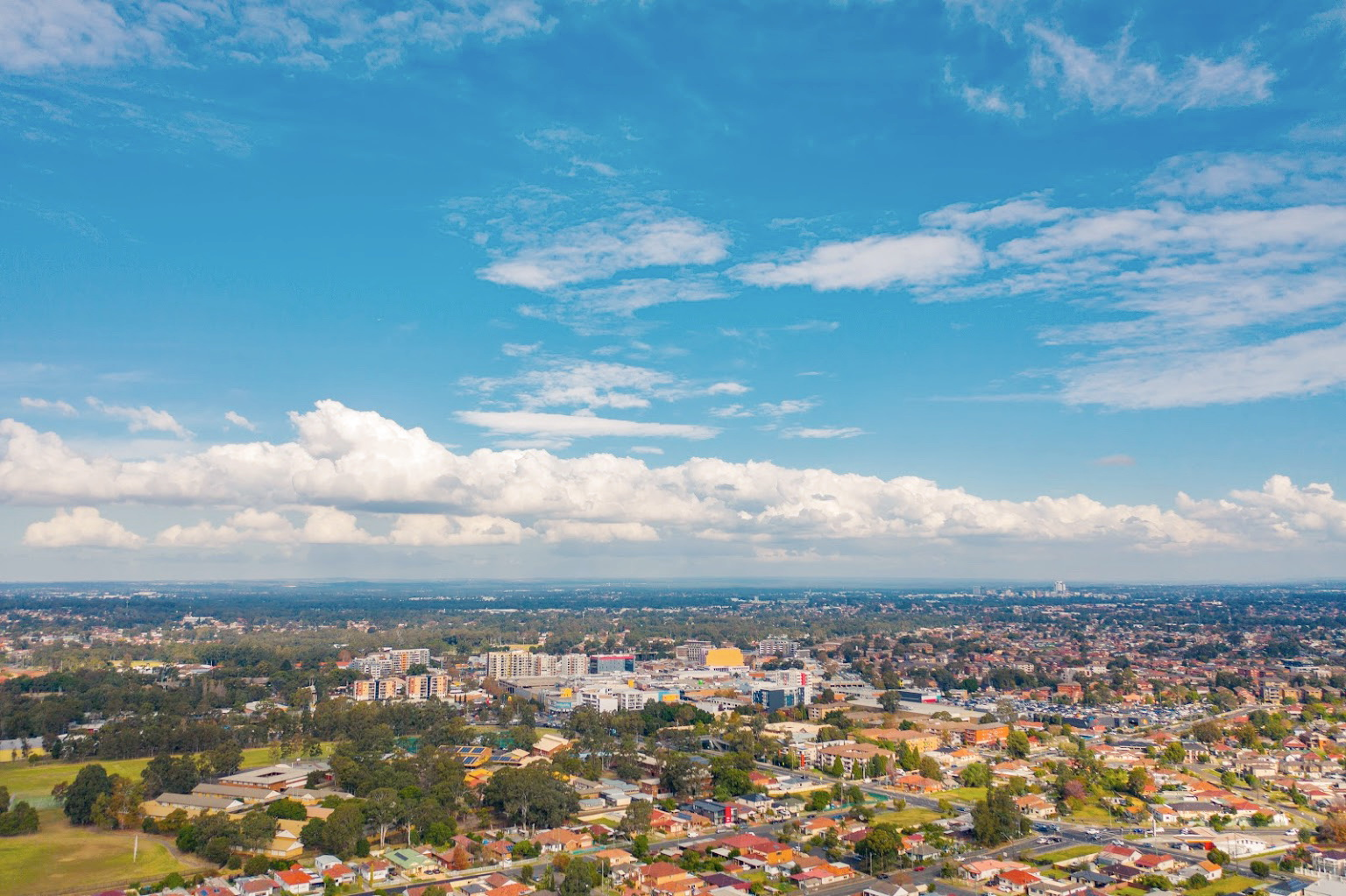
A bird's-eye view image of Western Sydney, Australia, showing the urban tree canopy

A 2018 study asked low income residents of Philadelphia "how often they felt nervous, hopeless, restless, depressed and worthless." As an experimental mental health intervention, trash was removed from vacant lots. Some of the vacant lots were "greened", with plantings of trees, grass, and small fences. Residents near the "greened" lots who had incomes below the poverty line reported a decrease in feelings of depression of 68%, while residents with incomes above the poverty line reported a decrease of 41%. Removing trash from vacant lots without installing landscaping did not have an observable mental health impact.

Urban forests and green spaces have been associated with milder ADHD symptoms. Children with ADHD struggle with directed attention—a type of attention that is a part of the theory of attention restoration. Directed attention entails "periods of deliberate focus" and requires breaks to continue productivity.

A case study conducted in Belgrade, Serbia, evaluated the mental health benefits of The Faculty Urban Forest for a younger population. Time spent in an arboretum is shown to benefit mental health by lowering depression, anxiety, and stress. An ideal forest environment for psychological improvement should have an extensive assortment of coniferous and broadleaved species displaying vibrant colors. These conditions provide a multitude of sensory experiences, which can be experienced with infrastructure such as benches, picnic tables, and pavilions. It is important to provide handicap-accessible options and locate urban forests close to public transportation so that they can support daily visits and restorative experiences for all.

=== Tree canopy inequity ===
Urban tree canopy inequity is defined by American Forests as the uneven distribution of urban trees in neighborhoods that are socioeconomically disadvantaged. These neighborhoods that lack sufficient canopy cover compared to areas that have access to suitable canopy cover, experience inaccessibility to the benefits that trees provide, and other social inequalities. Many of the neighborhoods that are most impacted by this inequity are where minorities and impoverished populations reside. This inequity of the urban tree canopy is caused by many social factors, such as environmental racism, which is environmental injustice that largely impacts racial groups by policies or practices, such as redlining policies. This resulted in the trend that poorer and predominantly minority neighborhoods experience less canopy cover.

Urban tree canopy inequity limits the access to the beneficial ecosystem services that trees provide. Populations that do not live in neighborhoods with suitable canopy cover do not experience the protection from the impacts of climate change and the urban heat island effect, air and water pollution, trapping of rainfall surface runoff, and energy savings on air conditioning from tree shade. These populations also do not benefit from the psychological benefits that trees provide, such as having areas that increase social cohesion and congregation, recreation, and nature aesthetics.

An example of other social benefits associated with urban tree canopy includes a research study reviewed by The Children & Nature Network, an organization active in the movement of connecting children and their families to nature. Researchers conclude that there is a positive relationship between academic performance and tree cover and species composition, indicating that tree cover and species composition have a positive effect on the academic performance of primary school-aged children, especially those enrolled in socio-economically challenged schools.

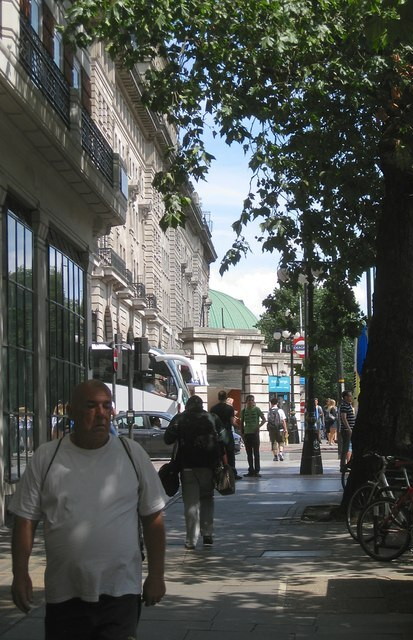
Pedestrians walking in the shade of mature plane trees on a hot August day in central London

A lack of trees in neighborhoods and a heavy presence of impervious surfaces such as houses, sidewalks, and parking lots, contribute to the heat island effect and there is a lack of temperature moderation. In these areas, temperatures are more extreme. Without the presence of trees, there would be poor air quality and an increase in air pollution as trees remove carbon and pollutants from the air through sequestration, and storing it in their structures. A lack of trees would also result in the risk of chemicals and other harmful pollutants entering water sources and collecting on sidewalks and roads, as they would not be present to increase infiltration and to help reduce and manage rainwater runoff. Biodiversity and habitat for animals decline in these areas as trees are not available for animals and plants to utilize.

As urban tree canopy inequity remains present in lower-socioeconomically disadvantaged neighborhoods, impacting the livelihoods and environmental state of these areas and populations, efforts are being made by urban foresters, city officials, and organizations to address this problem and present solutions. Examples of these efforts include the United States Forest Service outreach and education programs. Organizations such as Casey Tree's Community Tree Planting projects, the Greening of Detroit program, and American Forests help to implement programs and initiatives within cities and neighborhoods to engage volunteers, preserve and care for the urban forest and promote educational and career opportunities for the public.

Case studies, such as one based in Washington, D.C., analyze and contribute to the knowledge of urban tree canopy inequity by utilizing various methods including interviews, collaboration with private and public organizations, and community outreach that are successful and help present solutions for urban tree canopy inequity. The use of online applications such as i-Tree and its associated tree and forest assessment tools, and Tree Equity Score, along with many others, assist urban foresters, professionals, and students in conducting research on urban areas and presenting planning solutions to urban tree canopy inequity.

==== Inequities in environmental and health impacts ====
In the 1930s as part of the New Deal, the federal government started implementing unfair redlining policies, which classified certain neighborhoods as "risky" areas for banks and mortgage lenders to approve in funding home investments. Demographics of these communities typically included higher percentages of Black, African American, and Latino community members. These redlining policies led to overall lack in investment in these areas, including lack of equitable investment in environmental resources. There remain lower percentages of tree canopy coverage in nearly every U.S. city that had formerly redlined neighborhoods, including the three most populous U.S. cities, New York, Chicago, and Los Angeles. People living in urban communities with significantly lower percentages of urban trees do not benefit from the same environmental and health impacts as those in communities with greater tree populations.

In New York, specifically, the South Bronx has far fewer trees than New York City neighborhoods with higher income levels. Tree canopy coverage in the Bronx, in general, is the lowest of all five New York City boroughs. There is only 19.86% canopy coverage provided by street trees, which is much lower than the citywide average of 23.98%. The New York City Department of Health's Heat Vulnerability Index (HVI) measures how the risk of heat related illness and death differs across city neighborhoods, and it shows that New York City neighborhoods that are more heat-vulnerable, such as those in the South Bronx, tend to have lower tree canopy coverage.

Populations living in these communities are at greater risk for heat related illness, such as heat stroke, or death due to heat waves. Health outcomes associated with air pollution, such as asthma, are also worse off in neighborhoods with lower tree canopy coverage. In the Bronx, childhood asthma rates are disproportionately high. Children in the Bronx visit the emergency room for asthma 2x the rate of children in other boroughs. There are approximately 17% of children (age 13 and younger) suffering from asthma in the Bronx, compared to the citywide average of 11%.

=== Impacts on wildlife ===
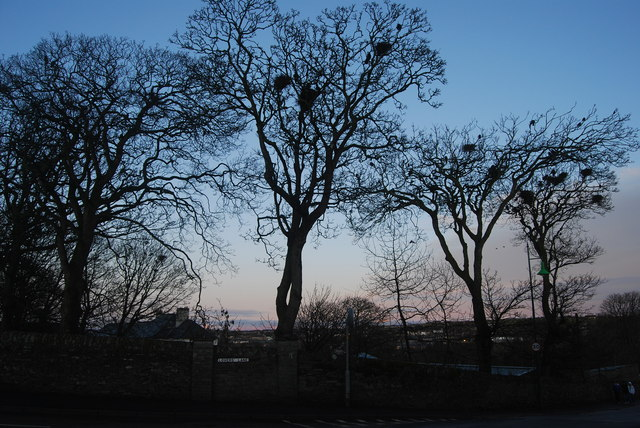
Birds' nests in trees

Urban forests in the built environment affect urban wildlife in several ways. An urban habitat can impact wildlife behavior significantly and can alter the ecology of urban wildlife, influencing these organisms' behavior. The interactions between humans and wildlife and the impacts of urbanization on these wildlife populations influence cities across the world.

==== Disturbances ====
Disturbances in urban forests are known for occurring more frequently and with higher intensities than in nature. Changes in the urban landscape can lead to greater competition for resources among species on fragmented areas of land, leading to more stress for urban wildlife. Urban wildlife is also exposed to warmer temperatures as well as higher levels of pollution as cities alter the natural environment significantly.

The construction of urban infrastructure requires deforestation, leveling, and other activities that lead to habitat fragmentation, reduced genetic diversity, and changes in behavior. Urban wildlife is also exposed to higher amounts of toxic substances, including heavy metals, road treatments, or pesticides from lawns that can lead to abnormal reproduction or development. Consumption of prey species by domesticated pets, such as dogs and cats, also leads to an increased mortality rate in urban habitats. Urban forests are essential to creating habitats for wildlife within cities, and many species have adapted to living in the disturbed conditions of the built environment by utilizing urban green-spaces. Research has shown diverse green-spaces to be better suited for wildlife. For example, in Kraków, Poland, the species richness of owls was higher in parts of the city with varied land uses than more homogeneous areas. Additional support for land-use diversity in urban areas is provided in a study showing the importance of leaving dead and decaying trees on the landscape for wildlife habitat.

Urban forests can alter natural diets by providing dietary supplements to wildlife in the form of fruit or nut-producing ornamental plants, trash, or even domestic pets like cats. By examining coyote scat and using stable isotope analysis, it was estimated that about 22% of the scat or 38% of the urban coyote diet was from human-created sources.

Having wildlife interacting around humans in urban areas can create conflicts between humans and animals. A case study in Aspen, Colorado observed the foraging habits of bears, tracking their movements using GPS collars, and found that bears visited forested areas in the city with fruit-bearing trees for food. Alternatively, in a study on the behavioral ecology of urban deer populations, the authors discussed the difficulty of managing this species due to its positive public perception as an aesthetically pleasing animal. Proper species selection, placement of trees, and other urban forest management strategies can be utilized to mitigate human-wildlife conflicts in cities.

=== Ecosystem services ===
==== Cultural services ====
Cultural services are non-material benefits (such as aesthetics and spiritual enrichment) that can be obtained from an ecosystem. Certain tree species have cultural value to different groups of people, and different tree species provide a range of different aesthetic values. The tree species that urban foresters plant affect many cultural benefits provided by urban forestry, such as an increase in physical health, psychological health, social health, property values, community economic development, and tourism. Understanding the values and interests of the different stakeholders in the community can help improve the cultural services provided through urban forestry.

==== Regulating services ====
Trees are important in regulating ecosystem processes; they contribute to filtering air pollution, microclimate regulation, carbon dioxide sequestration, and reducing climate change. Trees can reduce the urban heat island effect through shading paved areas, aiding in airflow, and evapotranspiration. When planted and managed properly, these cooling benefits extend past the city itself.

If not planted in locations ideal for their survival, trees will be vulnerable to disease. Diseased trees provide decreased ecosystem services, making it important for urban forestry to be a part of the planning and management of the urban canopy. Trees in urban environments can also aid in stormwater management and reduce the risk of flash floods by intercepting rainfall in the tree canopy. Tree canopy interception can also minimize the amount of sediment and nutrient contamination that occurs downstream. This is now a focus in cities around the world through using water sensitive urban design (WSUD) in urban forestry. Urban forests protect watershed health by utilizing riparian and street buffering with urban forestry practices.

==== Provisioning services ====
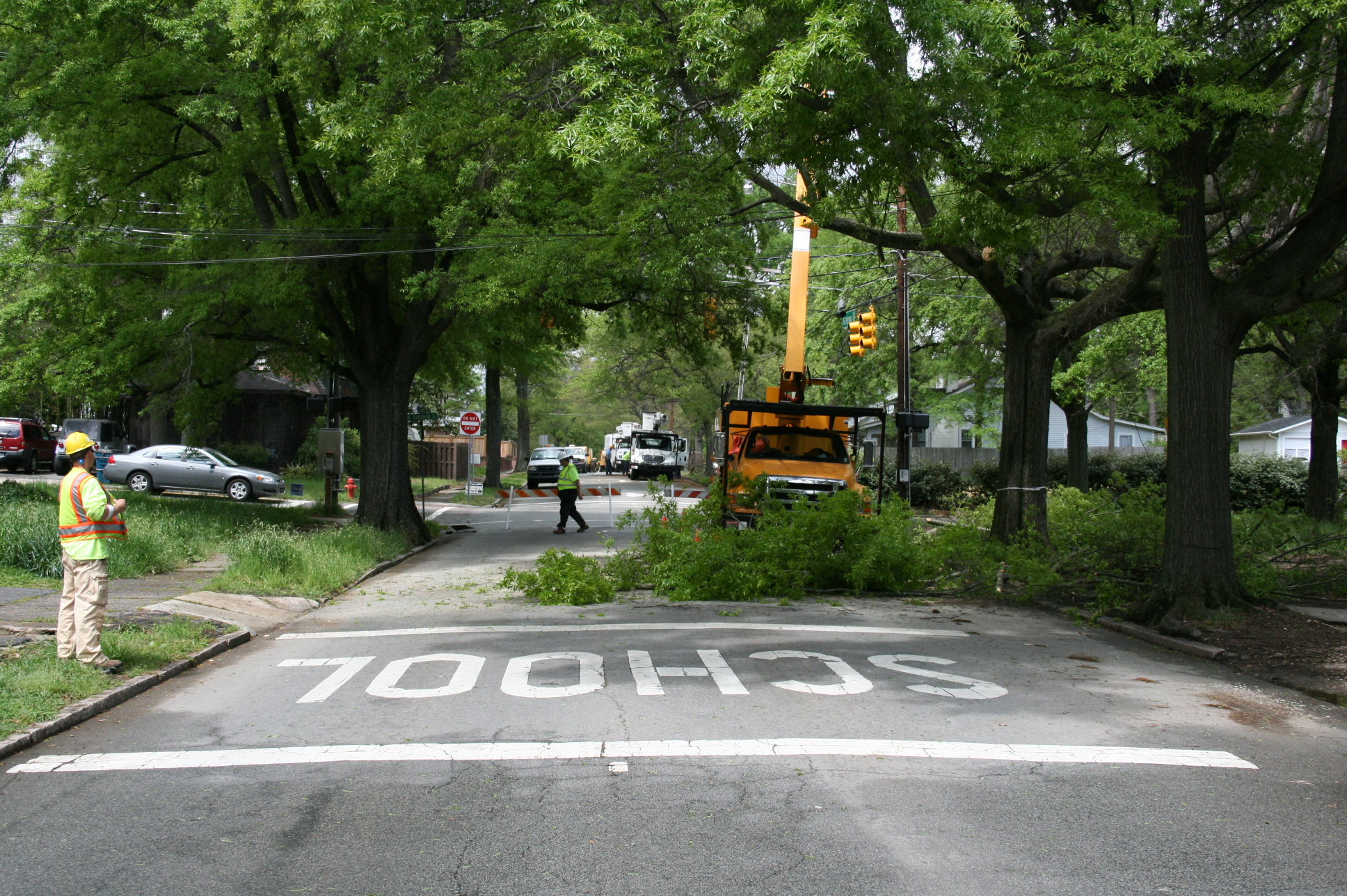
Tree pruning in Durham, North Carolina.

There are many different tree species that provide provisioning services in the urban forest. These services have a variety of names, including urban agriculture and edible green infrastructure. Wild food products produced from trees pose a variety of benefits to the residents in that area. They can supply food to local residents and wildlife and increase biodiversity in the community. These trees can be harvested by local residents with minimal education on urban foraging. Some examples of urban agriculture are fruit trees and rooftop gardens. While fruit trees can provide produce and many other benefits, they can also create a mess if the produce is not harvested and fruit is left on the ground.

Proper pruning can help reduce the mess created but not eliminate it. An urban forest that can provide produce significantly cuts down on food transportation from distant farms and therefore lowers carbon emissions annually. Urban wood utilization is an often overlooked provisioning service. Almost 70% of urban wood is wasted while only 25% is recycled and/or reused. Urban wood that is reused can be turned into useful products, such as furniture or bioenergy.

==== Supporting services ====
The supporting ecosystem services are necessary for the production of all other ecosystem services. Some of these services include biomass production, nutrient cycling, soil formation, and biodiversity. Additionally, proper management of urban forests can provide habits for native wildlife, including endangered species. Urban forests that include a large range of native and exotic trees provide a large range of habitats for wildlife. It has been shown in Sweden that certain endangered bird species mainly inhabit urban forests where certain trees are planted. One Swedish city contains two thirds of the red-list endangered species of the area by including endangered plants and habitats for endangered wildlife.

== Wildlife habitat management ==
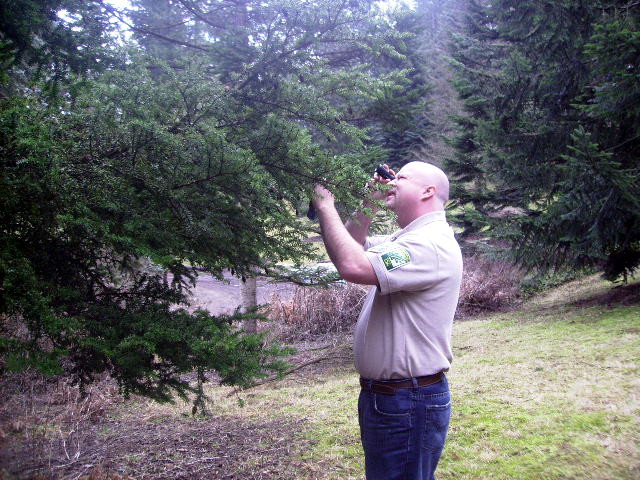
James Kinder, an ISA Certified Municipal Arborist examining a Japanese Hemlock at Hoyt Arboretum.

The urban forest provides habitat for many wildlife species, including song birds, squirrels and other small mammals, and insects. The urban forest provides the basics that animals need for survival; food, water, shelter, and space or habitat. Fruit or mast producing trees provide food sources, trees and other vegetation provide shelter and habitats, and artificial water sources in cities and their parks provide water. The urban forest can be planned and managed in the context of the wildlife populations in the area, increasing the population of desired species or decreasing the population of undesirable or invasive ones based on the biological and/or cultural carrying capacity of the municipality.

=== Biodiversity and threatened/endangered species ===
Biodiversity has been declining across the world due to climate change, deforestation, and the destruction of critical habitats. Preserving and bolstering biodiversity ensures that ecosystems of all kinds are functioning properly, and we can thus reap the benefits of ecosystem services. Urbanization holds potential solutions to achieve high levels of biodiversity when managed correctly. In the United States, the Endangered Species Act's language acts as a means to protect not only listed species but also the conservation of their habitats to sustain them, many of which are found in urban areas. Multiple transcontinental research projects on urban wildlife have found that there is a consistent positive correlation between human population density and species richness across all vertebrate taxonomic groups.

Urban areas provide and maintain a mosaic of diverse wildlife habitat to support existing and introduced fauna. Urban Forestry Management Plans in conjunction with Wildlife Management Plans can support and improve urban biodiversity by including following attributes: routine tree inventories to identify a biodiversity baseline for goal setting, intentional tree planting of hardy species to promote biodiversity, and lastly to focus on the preservation and improvement of urban parks and woodlots as vital wooded and edge habitats. Challenges to managing for biodiversity and endangered species include the difficulties in creating and managing artificial, fragmented, yet diverse habitat types simultaneously in the context of social problems such as poverty and crime.

=== Undesirable and invasive species ===
Invasive species are nonnative plants, animals, microbial pathogens, and fungi that cause damage environmentally and/or economically. These species are having a number of negative effects on our forests, both wild and urban, from being a nuisance to compromising and killing native trees. Oftentimes, invasive species are introduced via urban areas that serve as transportation hubs, meaning that the urban forest is typically the first to be affected by them, and can also serve as the first line of defense to keep them from invading native forests. Without one of the basics of survival, undesirable wildlife cannot inhabit the area. Trees and vegetation can be altered to decrease habitat space and fewer fruit producing trees could be planted or fruit could be cleaned up to limit food sources.

In response to the growing prevalence, many municipalities have begun planting disease and pest resistant cultivars, such as modified American elms and ash trees to prevent the spread of the fungal Dutch elm disease and emerald ash borer infestations, respectively. There are also rising regulations against the planting of invasive tree species that are harmful to the naturally occurring ecosystems because they can out compete native species for resources or attract undesirable wildlife. In April 2019, the state of Indiana enacted the Terrestrial Plants Rule, banning 44 invasive nursery species that cause harm to the urban forest and attract undesirable wildlife, including tree-of-heaven, honeysuckle and autumn olive. The Bradford pear, a common landscape tree, has been banned from the state of Ohio, and the cities of Charlotte, North Carolina and Pittsburgh, Pennsylvania, as they are known to spread quickly, crowding out native vegetation types from grasses to hardwood trees, further fragmenting and damaging the habitat of native animals as well.

=== Social impact ===
Urban forest related events such as planting festivals can significantly reduce social isolation problems, enhance people's experience and raise environmental awareness. Urban forests also encourage more active lifestyles by providing space for exercise and are associated with reduced stress and overall emotional well-being. Urban forests may also provide products such as timber or food, and deliver economic benefits such as increased property values and the attraction of tourism, businesses and investment.

==== Case study ====
The City of Denver Department of Parks and Recreation website hosts interactive online tools that allow residents to view the financial impact to their neighborhoods directly related to healthy tree planting. In the Washington-Virginia Vale neighborhood the city website cites 2,002 individual trees as having been planted and maintained by the City Forester. These trees are believed to bring in an annual ecosystem benefit of $159,521. This is mostly wrapped up in property benefits, which cite a contribution to this total of $143,331. The majorities of these trees are between 0 and 12 feet tall and are a mix of mostly Elm, Maple, Pine, and Locust species.

=== Economic impacts ===
==== Lifespan value ====
Trees serve an economical function within the urban forest, providing various monetary benefits. It is estimated that there are around 3.8 billion trees in urban areas around the United States, equating to $2.4 trillion in overall structural value. In addition, environmental and social benefits such as air quality, climate change, water flow, real estate, and even community well-being can be quantified to determine their economical impact. Examples of the economic values created by the urban forest includes an annual $4.7 billion of air pollution removal, $3.8 billion in carbon sequestration. Additionally, recreational experiences have the potential to surpass $2 billion in annual value.

The value of an urban forest is estimated by quantifying social and ecosystem services, then assigning those services monetary worth, which are often based on market value. Modeling tools, such as i-Tree, are used by urban foresters to accurately assess the effects of an urban forest's structure; this information is used to quantify ecosystem services and ultimately the economic value of the forest across a variety of locations. By creating these models, urban foresters are able to quantify and communicate the value of the urban forest to stakeholders and the general public. These evaluations can be used to influence the amount of money allocated to tree management by the government and general populace. Trees may live a long and healthy life if they continue to receive proper management in the form of maintenance and pruning, which sustains the value of the urban forest. Moreover, after death, trees have the potential to remain profitable to the community— if utilized correctly.

==== Post life value ====
Typically, wood products such as lumber and wood pellets are associated with rural forestry and logging. Annually, urban forestry creates 14.8 metric tons of wood waste in the United States through pruning and removal. Within urban forestry there are initiatives to use this waste as wood products such as fuel, lumber, art, and more. These initiatives seek to extend the value of urban trees after their lives. One such initiative is the Virginia Urban Wood Group, a nonprofit with the mission to, "enhance the quality of life through the Stewardship of our Commonwealth's urban and community trees." The Virginia Urban Wood Group promotes the production and sale of wood products sourced from urban wood waste. The group connects governmental and commercial professionals such as arborists, municipal foresters, mills, carpenters, and more.

Another group contributing to the urban wood waste industry is Wisconsin Urban Wood. This group collects suitable removed trees from local businesses and arborists and sells the wood to local mills. While urban lumber may not be as high of a grade quality as forest grown lumber, these products are suitable for smaller projects such as woodworking and artisan furniture. Some localities use their urban lumber to reduce costs on amenity construction— they use their wood to build their picnic tables and benches. Additionally, some urban wood initiatives seek the use of reclaimed wood to decrease the use of freshly cut lumber.

== Practice ==
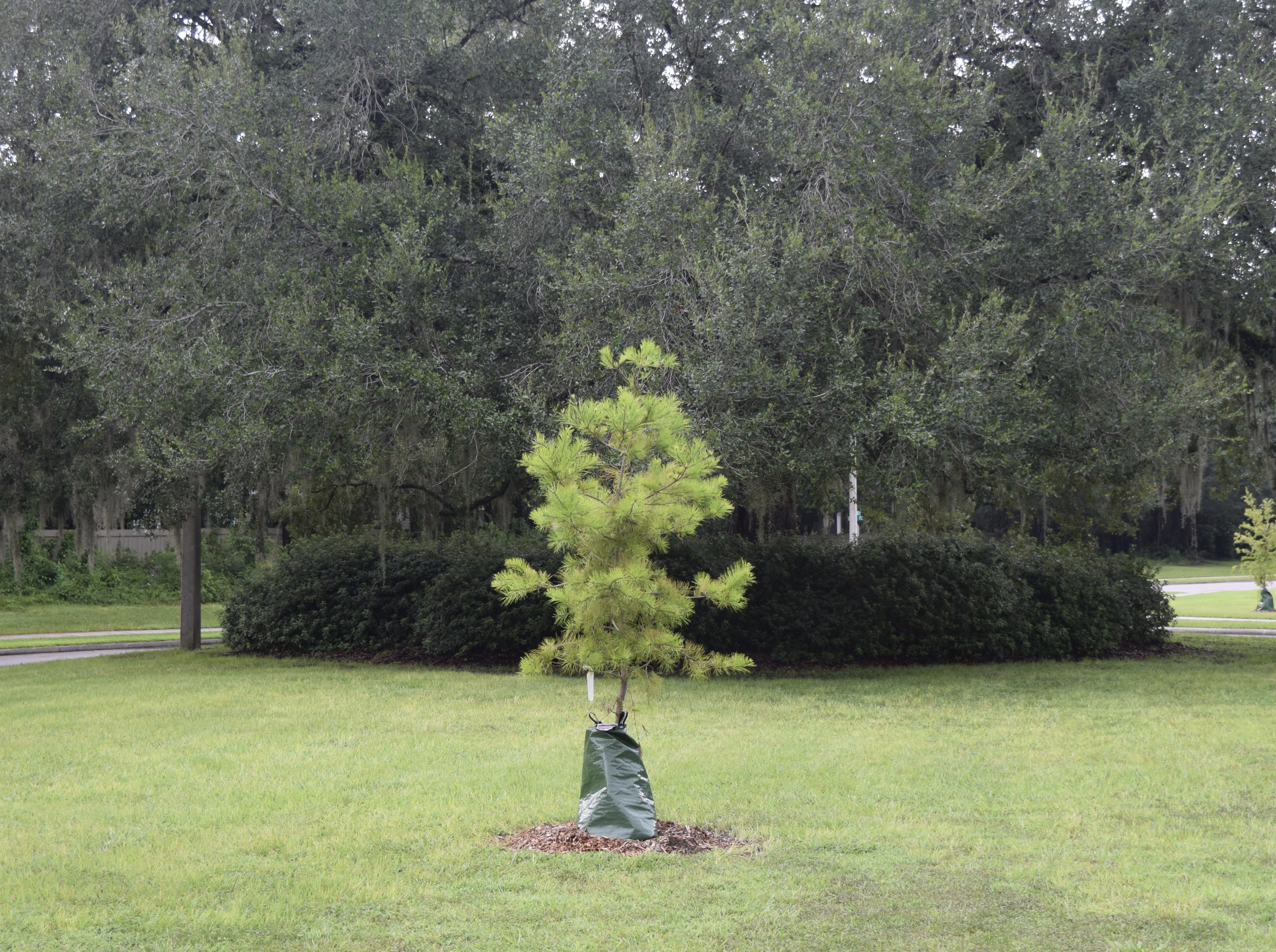
Many trees when first planted will be placed in a watering bag to help it grow.

Urban forestry is a practical discipline, which includes Tree planting, care, and protection, and the overall management of trees as a collective resource. The urban environment can present many arboricultural challenges such as limited root and canopy space, poor soil quality, deficiency or excess of water and light, heat, pollution, mechanical and chemical damage to trees, and mitigation of tree-related hazards. Among those hazards are mostly non-immediate risks like the probability that individual trees will not withstand strong winds (as during a thunderstorm) and damage parking cars or injure passing pedestrians.

Although quite striking in an urban environment, large trees in particular present a continuing dilemma for the field of urban forestry due to the stresses that urban trees undergo from automobile exhaust, constraining hardscape and building foundations, and physical damage (Pickett et al. 2008). Over time these constraints have led urban forestry managers to select smaller statured trees, which is contributing to a shrinking urban forest and less ecosystem services. Urban forestry also challenges the arborists that tend the trees. The lack of space requires greater use of rigging skills and traffic and pedestrian control. The many constraints that the typical urban environment places on trees limits the average lifespan of a city tree to only 32 years – 13 years if planted in a downtown area – which is far short of the 150-year average life span of trees in rural settings (Herwitz 2001).

Management challenges for urban forestry include maintaining a tree and planting site inventory, quantifying and maximizing the benefits of trees, minimizing costs, obtaining and maintaining public support and funding, and establishing laws and policies for trees on public and on private land. Urban forestry presents many social issues that require addressing to allow urban forestry to be seen by the many as an advantage rather than a curse on their environment. Social issues include under funding which leads to inadequate maintenance of urban trees. In the UK the National Urban Forestry Unit produced a series of case studies around best practice in urban forestry which is archived here.

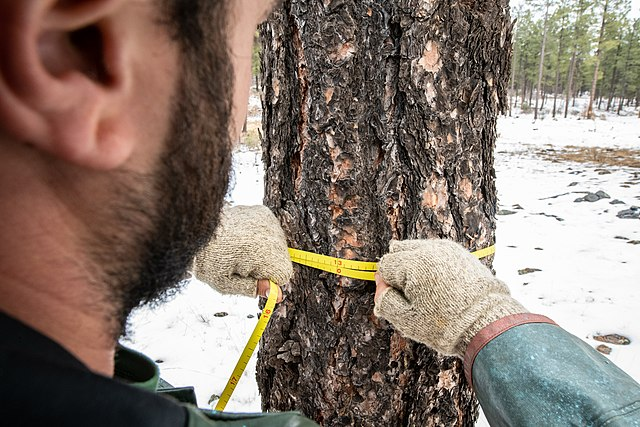
Proper measurement of diameter at breast height (DBH) as part of an urban forest inventory

=== Training and credentials ===
Within the profession and practice of urban forestry, training and credentials are often a prerequisite to proper and efficient management. Skills within urban forestry may consist of community-based tree stewardship, restoration of neglected spaces, urban canopy monitoring and maintenance, and building social cohesion in urban neighborhoods. Higher education, field experience, and credentials are used to effectively develop and verify these goals. Achievement of the above training can provide prospects for commercial or governmental career opportunities such as a Certified Arborist, Certified Forester, Urban Forester, Professional Consulting Forester, Forestry Technician, and many more.

Higher education in urban forestry is a method of training for aspiring urban foresters. Careers in urban forestry often require higher education that concentrates in urban forestry, arboriculture, forestry, horticulture, natural resource management, urban planning, and environmental science. These interdisciplinary educational disciplines provide crucial knowledge for urban foresters including collecting attribute data of the urban forest and the implementation of best management practices. Precise data on the urban forest is often scarce and not up-to-date due to the difficulty of traditional sampling approaches. Higher education provides insight to modernized technologies that analyze the urban forest, such as remote sensing, and generates accurate data with more precise details on urban tree canopy, individual tree metrics, species, and age structures. The aforementioned educational training creates a path to becoming a credible urban forester.

While in-classroom education is one method of training, experiential learning is highly recommended in order to hone the more technical aspects of the field, such as tree inventory, planting, and pest management. This field work also extends to training social skills. Community and client-based relationships often require a certain social expertise to resolve conflict. Through field training and client interaction, skills in conflict management are acquired. This may include, but not limited to effective listening, participatory planning, and leadership. Social engagement is increasingly necessary when working with marginalized communities, formatting budget plans, managing aesthetics, and other urban forestry responsibilities. Through internships, job experience, and field training opportunities, many skills are developed that are crucial for professions in urban forestry.

Earning credentials and certifications through professional organizations, such as the International Society of Arboriculture (ISA) and the Tree Care Industry Association (TCIA), are often specific qualifications for becoming an urban forester. The ISA, for example, is a global organization that offers an array of certifications and qualifications, including ISA Certified Arborist. According to a 2020 survey, urban forestry employers desired most employees who possessed the ISA Certified Arborist credential, followed by a commercial pesticide applicator license, and a commercial driver's license. It should be recognized that such credentials require a minimum time period of on-the-job training followed by a written and/or practical exam. To accomplish certifications such as these, online course material and tangible study guides can be purchased, such as through the ISA's website. After thorough review, computer-based and paper exams can be taken to officially earn a certain credential.

As urban forestry focuses on the extensive management of trees, these organizations are geared to credentialing arborists, or those who manage trees intensively. The TCIA is another professional organization that sets standards for tree firms and provides education and information through publications, conferences, and workshops. While the TCIA is designed to provide tree care firms with training and certification, certain programs, such as the Electrical Hazards Awareness Program (EHAP), may benefit those in urban forestry. An urban forester who directly manages street trees, for example, may find the EHAP useful, for their management decisions because street trees are often affected by overhead and/or underground utilities.

Higher education, field work, and credentials are all methods of training that provide experiences for someone pursuing a career in urban forestry. This training is crucial to establishing trust among urban forest stakeholders and withholding professionalism in the urban forest industry.

=== Street trees ===
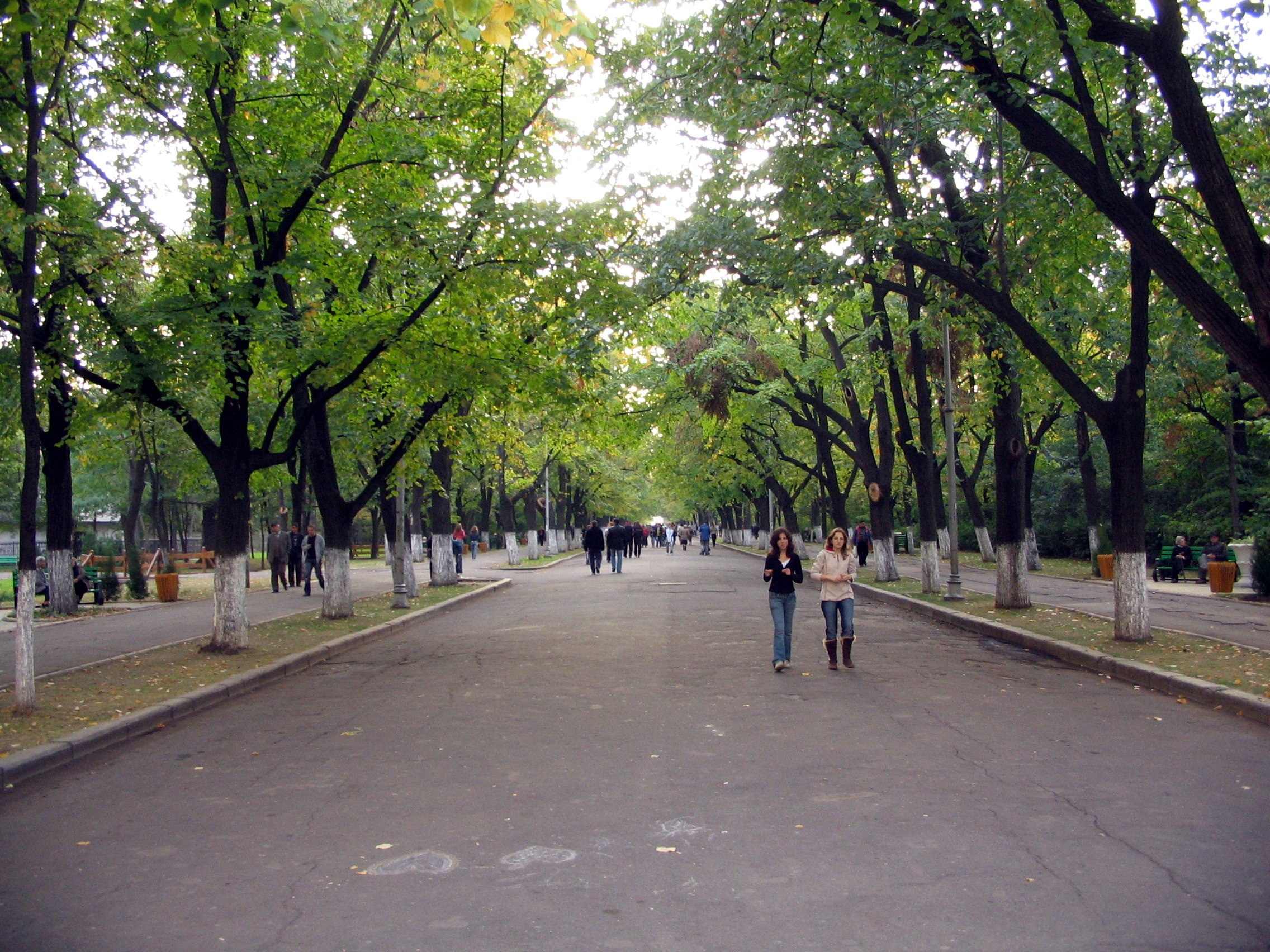
Street trees in Buzău, Romania.

A street tree is any tree that is growing in a city thoroughfare, whether between the sidewalk and the curb or in an unimproved right-of-way. Street trees provide valuable ecosystem services including stormwater mitigation, air pollutant removal, and shade to mitigate the urban heat island effect. Since street trees are often planted in areas with a high percentage of impervious surfaces, they are an important fraction of an area's overall urban tree cover. When planting street trees, there are many factors to consider and difficulties to overcome. Depending on climate, soil moisture, nutrient dynamic, and location much planning goes into planting street trees. If done incorrectly these trees can cost a municipality time and money to maintain and remove. Urban site conditions, Species selection, and tree management are three key aspects of cultivating street trees.

Urban sites present many challenges to street trees because of their adverse conditions. Limited soil volume, high soil compaction, and intense microclimates are common where street trees are planted. Because of these adverse conditions, street trees typically have lower growth rates and lower survival rates than trees planted in nurseries or more natural settings. There are also conflicts between tree parts and urban infrastructure because of dense urban environments. Tree roots are known to inflict costly damage by fracturing pavement, which is a common cause for tree removal. In order to receive the full benefit of ecosystem services of street trees, urban foresters aim to minimize these conflicts and provide young trees with the highest opportunity to reach maturity.

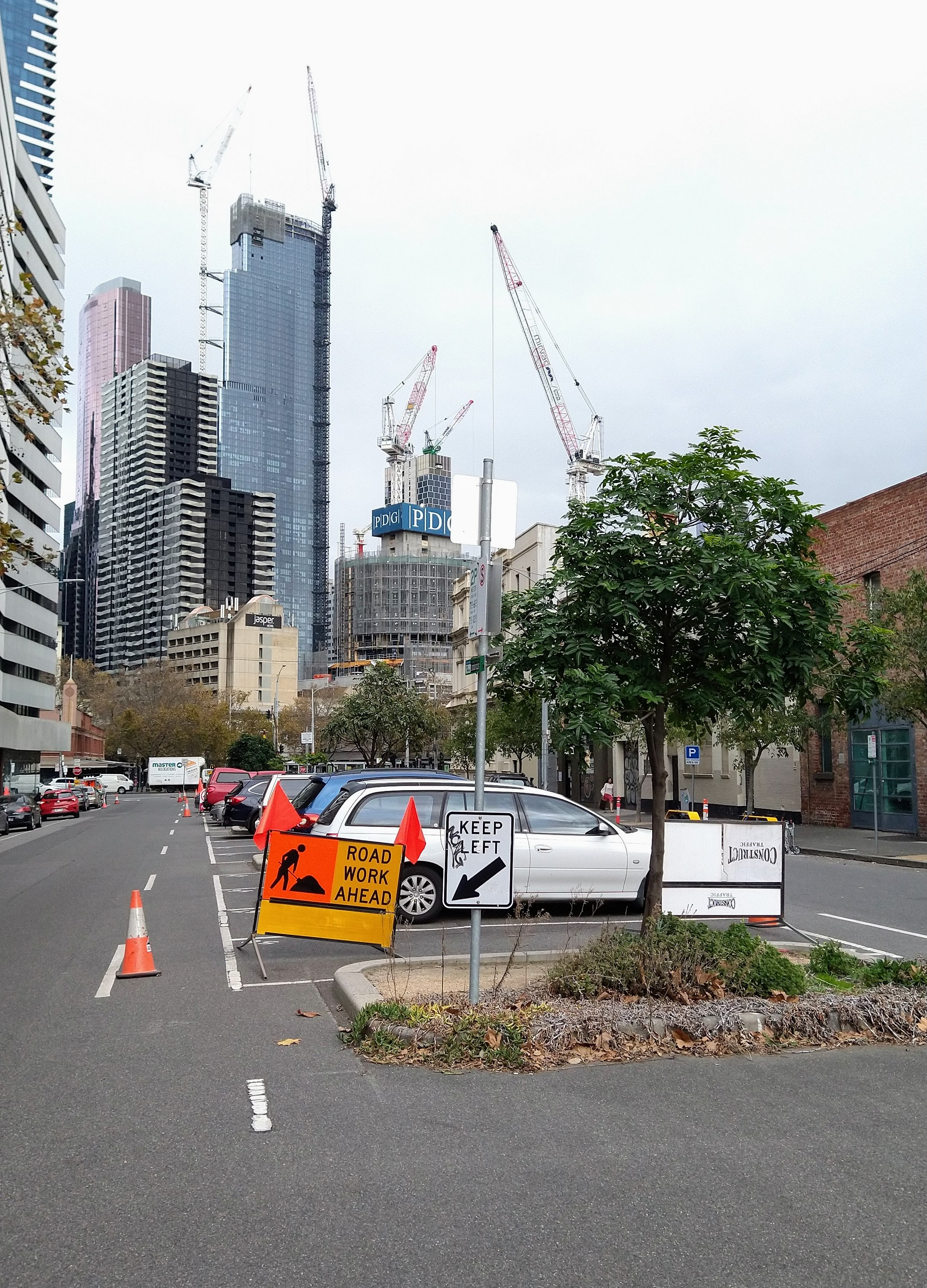
Street trees have to be highly tolerant in often hostile conditions and with numerous human disturbances. Melbourne, Australia.

A guiding principle of urban forestry is to plant the right tree in the right place. Certain species are more tolerant of adverse urban conditions than others, and urban foresters strive to select species that will maximize benefits and minimize costs for a specific site. For example, yellow-poplar (Liriodendron tulipifera) is known to be intolerant of poor urban soils, and therefore is rarely used as a street tree. There is no tree species perfectly suited for every site so characteristics of each species are scrutinized to determine their suitability for planting as a street tree. Some important characteristics of street tree species include tolerance of alkaline soils, compacted soils, low soil volume, de-icing salts, drought, and having good structure. Blackgum (Nyssa sylvatica) and swamp white oak (Quercus bicolor) are species renowned for their adaptability to urban environments, but even they have drawbacks such as Blackgum being difficult to transplant. The London plane (Platanus × hispanica) has been planted in cities all over the world, due to being highly tolerant of urban environments.

Planning is an important step in the establishment of street trees. Policies and guidelines are beneficial in the street tree planning process by lowering costs and improving the health and safety of a municipality. Studies have shown that municipalities that do not abide by policies and guidelines are shown to have higher costs in economic and environmental aspects. Models and formulas may also be used to warrant adequate species diversity for more resiliency to disturbances and stressors. An example of a formula that municipalities abide by in planning is Santamour's 10-20-30 rule. This formula allows for no more than 10% of the same tree species, no more than 20% of the same genus, and no more than 30% of the same family.

The Species Selection Model focuses on procedures that create a suitable street tree by surveying common species used in urban areas. The Analytic Hierarchy Process is a three layer structure that includes an objective, criteria, and factors. Some factors that may be included in street tree establishment are tree height, DBH, canopy density, and drought resistance. Planning for the physical tree planting should consider bare root and balled-and burlapped (B&B) trees. When deciding upon bare root or B&B, species, age, street traffic intensity, site type, wound presence, and dimensions of sidewalk pit cuts should be examined. Taking into account bare root and B&B trees along with the above criteria are beneficial in the physical aspects of establishing street trees.

According to the Senseable City Lab at the Massachusetts Institute of Technology (MIT), which measures urban canopy cover in the world's most prominent cities, the city of Tampa had a Green View Index of 36.1%, representing the total percentage of the city covered by urban trees. Tampa was followed by Singapore (29.3%), Oslo (28.8%), Sydney and Vancouver (both tying at 25.9%), Cambridge, Massachusetts (25.3%). By using satellite data that show trees in parks, homes and on streets, researchers at the United States Forest Service selected 25 of the most populated urban areas (only one city per country) to analyze how their tree coverage compared, where it put New York City in first place (with 39.2% of tree cover), followed by Moscow (29.1%), São Paulo (27.4%), and Paris (26.4%). Frankfurt was named European City of Trees in 2014 for its care of its trees, and for featuring around 200,000 of trees in public spaces and in Frankfurt City Forest.

=== Case study: Nashville tree density increase bill ===
In late March 2019, the Nashville Metro Council announced its plan to cut down 21 cherry trees from Riverfront Park so that a temporary outdoor stage could be constructed for the NFL draft. Immediate public outcry from residents, including a Change.org petition that garnered over 80,000 signatures, pressured the city and the NFL to revise the plan so that only 10 trees would be uprooted and relocated, leaving the remaining ones untouched.

Following these events Vice Mayor Jim Shulman contacted the Nashville Tree Conservation Corps, a non-profit that "works to promote, preserve, protect, and plant the tree canopy in Davidson County" in order to prevent future incidents such as this one. Thanks to the efforts of the lead sponsor of the bill, council member Jeff Syracuse, and the Nashville Tree Conservation Corps, more than two years later on August 19, 2021, the new public tree bill BL2021-829 was signed into law.

BL2021-829 "seeks to promote transparency and oversight within Metro departments regarding tree removal and replacement." The passage of the bill signaled the Nashville Metro Council's commitment to maintaining urban green space as the city underwent a development boom. Starting in 2015, Nashville experienced a surge of construction projects that consisted of high rise residential towers to a $220 million office building. This development has shown no signs of slowing down, and if left unchecked runs the risk of actively contributing to the environmental degradation of the city.

The law specifically addresses the removal of public trees by requiring that the public be notified of their removal at least two weeks beforehand and that replacements are planted. Key features of the law include the formation of a Tree Working Group, which reviews tree-related policies, and a Tree Review Panel made up of representatives from Water, Parks, Codes, Transportation, General Services, Planning, and the Mayor's Office who oversee public trees. It also mandates that a countywide tree canopy study be conducted every five years in order to keep accurate data on the public trees.

This kind of regulation of the city's trees promises both environmental and social benefits. Maintaining a healthy population of public trees in cities helps to reduce the effect of environmental issues that are common in urban landscapes, such as air pollution and waste heat. Prioritizing tree growth also supports biophilic urban design, which has shown to have health benefits and facilitate stronger social and emotional connections among people.

== Planning ==
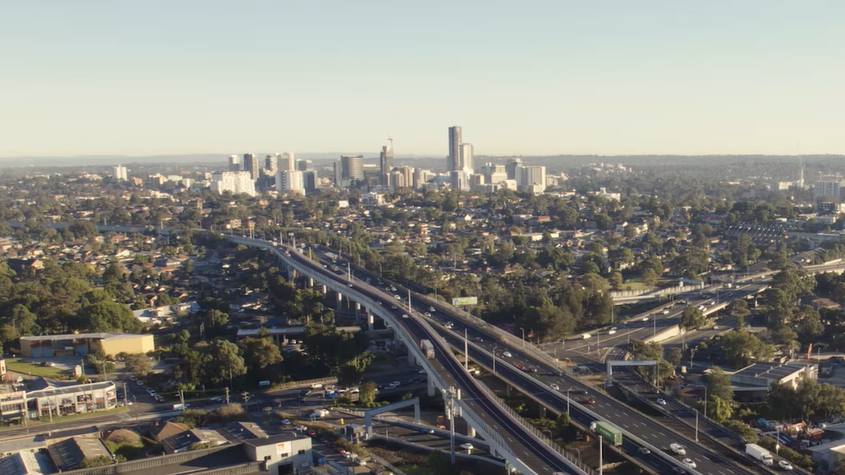
Urban canopy of Parramatta, New South Wales, Australia.

There are many benefits, costs, and challenges to planning an urban forest. Urban forests provide both ecosystem services and disservices that are considered prior to planning. Urban forests provide services such as improved air quality, noise reduction, temperature mitigation, and stormwater mitigation when they are placed in the right spot. Urban forest planning is used to maximize the benefits that trees provide by thoughtfully placing them in the best locations. Challenges that are faced during planning include managing the disservices from trees and valuating their services, the loss/replacement cost of green infrastructure, and the cost of remediating gray infrastructure interference. A major loss of green infrastructure could alter the sense of place, community identity, and social cohesion of a municipality.

When planning an urban forest there are several practices that can be used. Many municipalities put plans for an urban forest into an official document such as a master plan. While not every city can implement an urban forest plan, it is possible to implement plans for specific areas, such as parks, that would help increase the canopy cover of a municipality. Although most cities produce standalone urban forest plans, the city of Mountain View, California has adopted a combined biodiversity and urban forestry plan that considers tradeoffs with biodiversity goals.

During the creation of the urban forest management plan, criteria and goals are usually outlined in the plan early in the planning process. Determining criteria is done by assessing the current state of the urban forest and then incorporating criteria for performance goals into the management plan. Assessment is the first step in planning and provides necessary information on the forest extent, age distribution, tree health, and species diversity. Once the assessment is completed, the next step becomes deciding what criteria—or indicators—to incorporate into the plan so that there are set performance goals. Incorporating indicators into the management plan makes it easier to track the progress of the urban forest and whether goals are being met. Criteria/indicators typically focus on a category of urban forest management and usually include subjects such as:

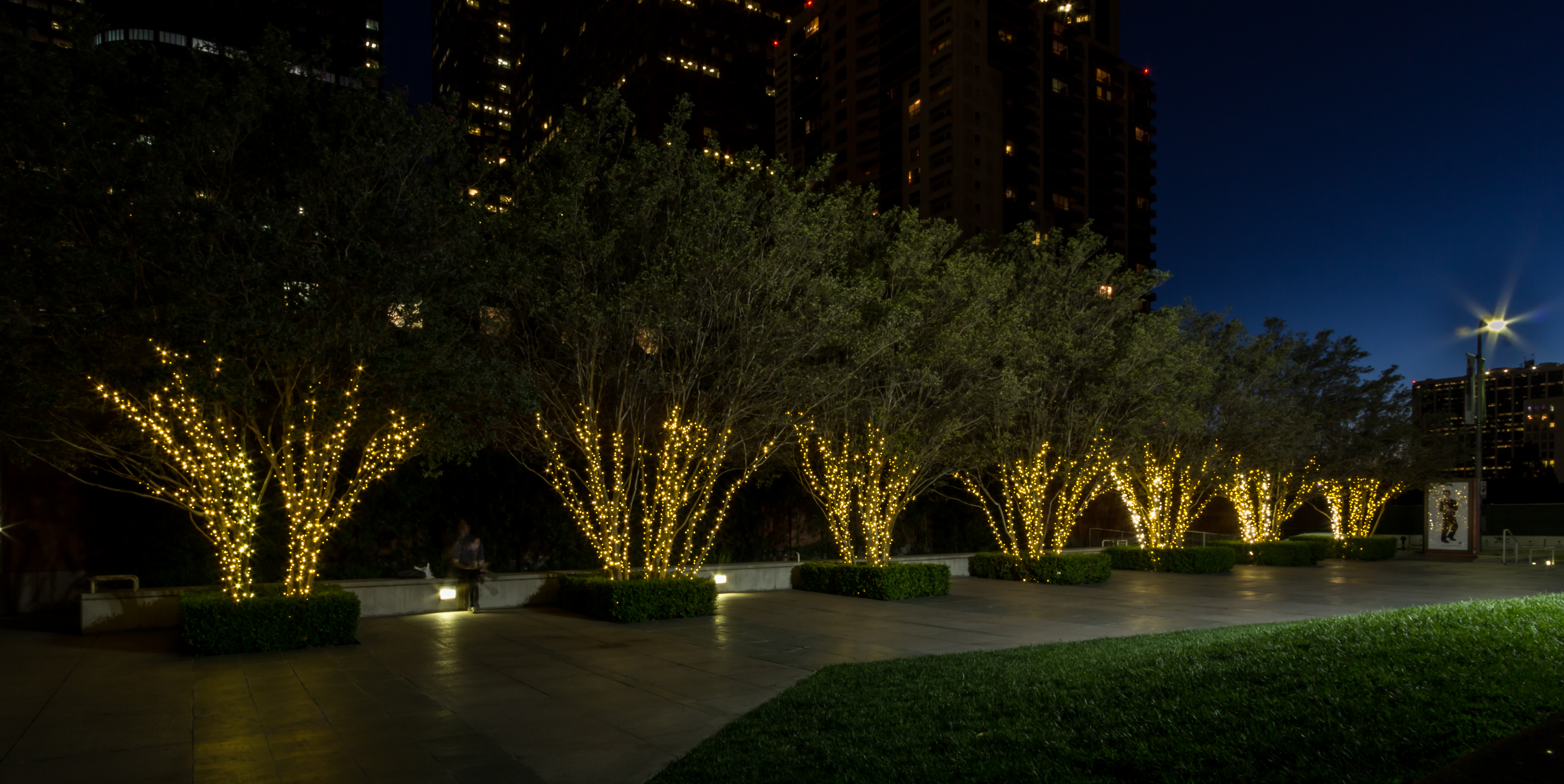
Green area on South Olive Street in Los Angeles, CA.

- The urban forest vegetation and its characteristics such as canopy cover, age distributions, and species diversity.
- Having a community focus that involves industry cooperation, and community and stakeholder involvement.
- The planning of the urban forest and whether it is successful in the management and funding of the urban forest.

The incorporation of indicators into management plans are a strong aid in the implementation and revision of management plans and help reach the goals within the plan.

A key part of a master plan is to map spaces where trees will be planted. In the paper A methodology to select the best locations for new urban forests using multicriteria analysis, three different steps are outlined for determining tree planting areas. The first stage is an excluding stage, which uses a set of criteria to exclude poor locations and indicate potential locations for planting. Second is a suitability stage, which evaluates the potential locations to determine a more selective group of suitable spots. Finally, the feasibility stage is a final test to determine if the suitable locations are the most feasible planting areas with minimal site use conflicts.

The management of urban forest planning falls into many hands. During the writing process of a plan, the input from professionals and citizens are taken into consideration. When designing the plan and determining planting locations, landscape architects, arborists, and urban foresters provide valuable input and knowledge as to what trees to plant and where, in order to ensure an urban forest that is long lived and healthy. The public works department and planning commissioners also play a role in the process to make sure that no trees are planted where they may interfere with emergency practices, underground or above ground utilities, or safety of the public in any way. Planning for an urban forest involves input from a variety of people and the consideration of how trees affect the community they grow in.

=== Assessment ===
Urban forest assessment is a strategy that is used within broader management and planning operations that allows urban foresters to better understand and care for the forest resource at hand. It allows aspects of the forest, such as ecosystem services and benefits, species composition, canopy distribution, and health, to be monitored and predicted for current and future management needs. Data from urban forest assessments can prove to be useful in not only providing information for foresters but in quantifying benefits that can show members of the public the importance of preserving and protecting trees in urban forest settings. Urban forest assessments are becoming integral to trees in urban communities as they plan and care for their trees, an example being found within cities like Tallahassee, Florida, that have incorporated assessment into their urban forest master plan. Within the United States, the USDA Forest Service has provided resources to inform foresters and community members about the importance of these assessments and the benefits to conducting them.

Urban forestry planning and management methods are key to creating and maintaining an urban forest that produces sustainable benefits for the surrounding community. Stakeholders, such as individual citizens, local volunteer groups, and political figures, can oftentimes be involved in the urban forest planning and management processes within municipalities. Urban forest assessments have the potential to increase urban forest economic, social, and cultural benefits to the community. Diverse stakeholder groups allow a comprehensive plan to develop with unique elements brought to attention by each group. Things included in an urban forest plan include land use, transportation, infrastructure, and green space because they all affect the urban forest structure. It will be determined per municipality why each of these is of certain importance and vice versa, as well as the proper actions to be taken to protect the urban forest function and role in the area.

An assessment must first be completed before any benefits are gained. There are generally two basic ways that urban forests are assessed. The bottom-up approach is a field inventory completed by crews on the ground. This process is detailed and can provide useful forest information needed for management decisions. The top-down approach utilizes aerial and satellite imagery to discern canopy cover, plantable space, and impervious surfaces at a low cost. There are different tools available to complete these assessments. i-Tree is a set of tools cooperatively created and maintained by the USDA Forest Service and other organizations. i-Tree Eco is commonly used for bottom-up approach assessment, and uses the field data collected by the user to quantify value and benefits of the trees. The i-Tree software also has tools helpful to top-down approaches. i-Tree Landscape uses National Land Cover Database (NLCD) along with other layers to provide information about canopy cover, plantable space, ecological benefits, and more. i-Tree Canopy allows the user to interpret aerial and satellite imagery to determine land cover on a smaller scale than landscape.

=== Impact of climate change ===
Cities and urban areas are more vulnerable to the growing impacts of climate change due to high amounts of paved surfaces, increased pollution, denser human population, and concentration of built structures. This leads to the urban heat island phenomena, in which urban areas with large amounts of impermeable, heat absorbing surfaces are measurably warmer than the surrounding areas, particularly those with more natural cover. As climate change impacts Earth, it will continue to disproportionately affect urban areas, and the warming will continue. This poses challenges for urban foresters as tree species will be pushed out of their species distribution as conditions change and become unfavorable. Trees and the urban canopy are vital in mitigating these heat effects and other challenges. They serve as an asset to the communities which is why planning and implementation of strategies to adapt are coming to the forefront.

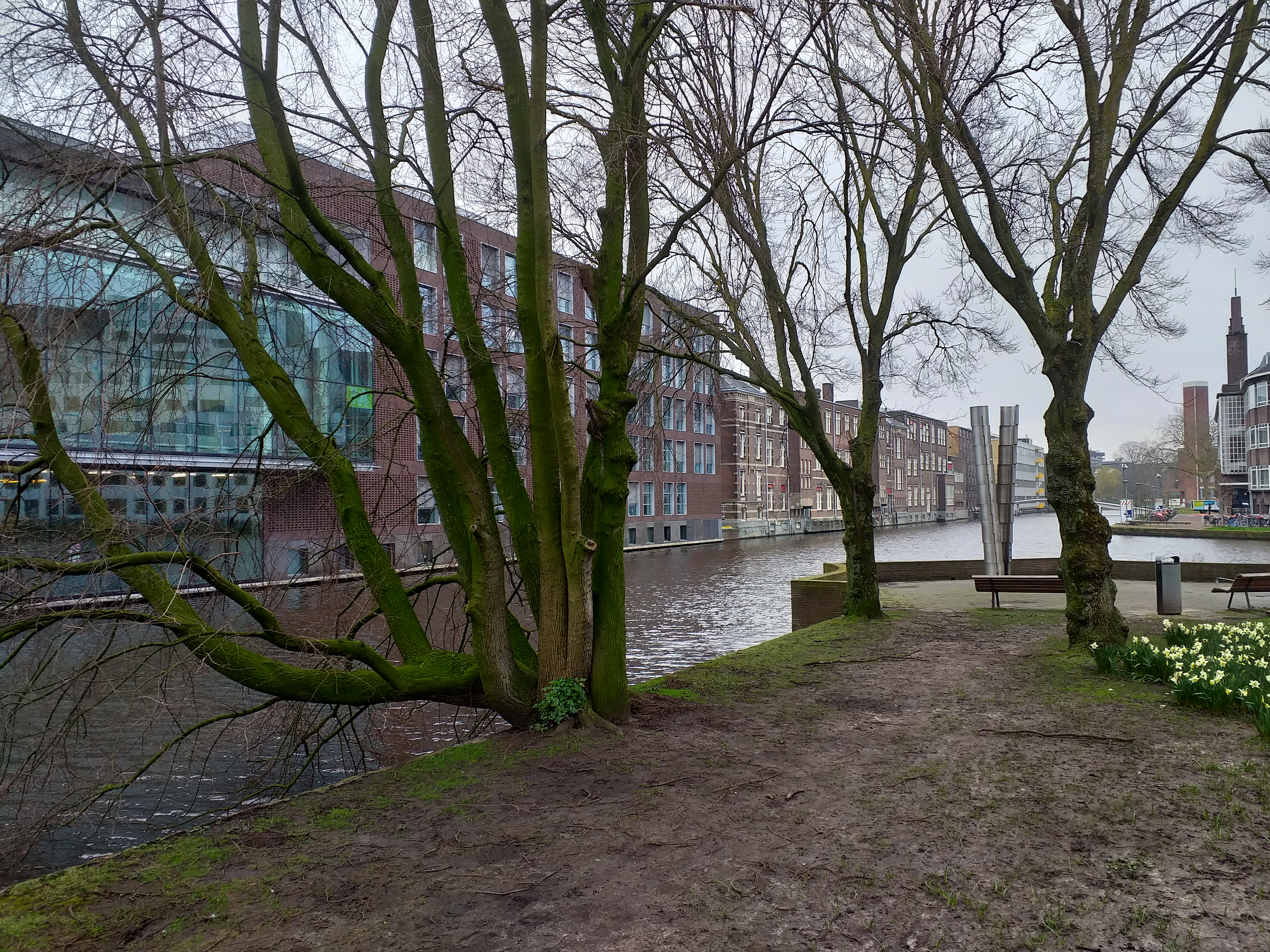
Trees strategically planted for flood mitigation in Amsterdam.

Since cities are heavily impacted by climate change, urban forestry professionals need to adopt strategies that will lessen the effect of climate change on cities. Many cities have created management plans to address this issue. The city of Chicago, Illinois, created a forest vulnerability assessment and synthesis in 2017 that looks at their current forest assessment and what the future could look like. They found that the species distribution will change for the native tree species and that stressors like drought, heat, and flooding will make the trees more vulnerable to pests and disease. A report published by the United States Department of Agriculture addresses the different ways that an urban forestry program can work to mitigate the impacts of climate change.

Some strategies include maintaining natural order (restore riparian buffers and use prescribed fires), promote an integrated pest management program, sustain native animal habitat, and reduce landscape fragmentation among others. Another recent study points out that public action is also a large part of combating climate change. Those researchers note that an urban forestry program is only as strong as its community support, and if the public does not see the urgency of climate change and understand the science behind the program's actions, then progress will be slow.

The city of Houston has developed a simple yet effective framework for tree planting to fight the increasingly noticeable effects of climate change. Native "super" tree species have been identified by a ranking system examining the highest combination of absorption of carbon dioxide, absorption other air pollutants, flood mitigation, and their ability to thrive under projected future climate conditions. Regions of the municipality experiencing disproportionately poor air quality, flooding, elevated heat, and high rates of health concerns are then mapped to plan for large-scale planting of ideal tree species. This framework can be altered and applied to any municipality to improve negative conditions worsened by climate change. The US Forest Service has also identified potential strategies for creating more resilient urban forests to be prepared for more unpredictable conditions. Important to this is the enhancement of taxonomic, structural, and functional diversity of trees in the urban forest. One way to accomplish diversity is through implementation of the 30-20-10 rule, which states that no more than 30% of the trees should belong to a single taxonomic family, no more than 20% of a single taxonomic genera, and no more than 10% a single taxonomic species.

== By country ==
=== Brazil ===
The Amazon rainforest is world famous for its ability to sequester carbon from our atmosphere. Since the 1960's, cities were integrally linked with their surrounding forest in the Brazilian Amazonia. Modern urbanization has degraded forests, depleting ecosystem services that are vital to city functioning. Invasive species seem to be a large issue in Brazilian urban forest conservation. Exotic and invasive species are more common than native in 29 amazonian urban forests. 34.7% of all identified species are invasive, while 65.3% were native. Urban forest development and management in Brazil is supported by legislation. The 2012 Brazilian Forest code states that city halls can require green areas in residential allotments, commercial property, and in public infrastructure.

==== Curitiba's RPPNM ====
Curitiba is internationally known as a pioneer city in conservationist efforts. Since 2006 Curitiba has instituted the Municipal Private Natural Heritage Reserves (RPPNM) project, allowing owners of relevant native areas within the city to turn them into privately owned natural reserves in exchange of being able to transfer that area's constructive potential somewhere else. This means instead of building on an area of Atlantic Forest, the owner of such can add what could have been built there somewhere else, allowing the building to which the building potential was transferred to surpass the usual urbanistic height and density limit, thus preserving the forest and zeroing the urban impact. The project won 2006's UNEP-Bayer Young Environmental Envoy programme.

=== Canada ===
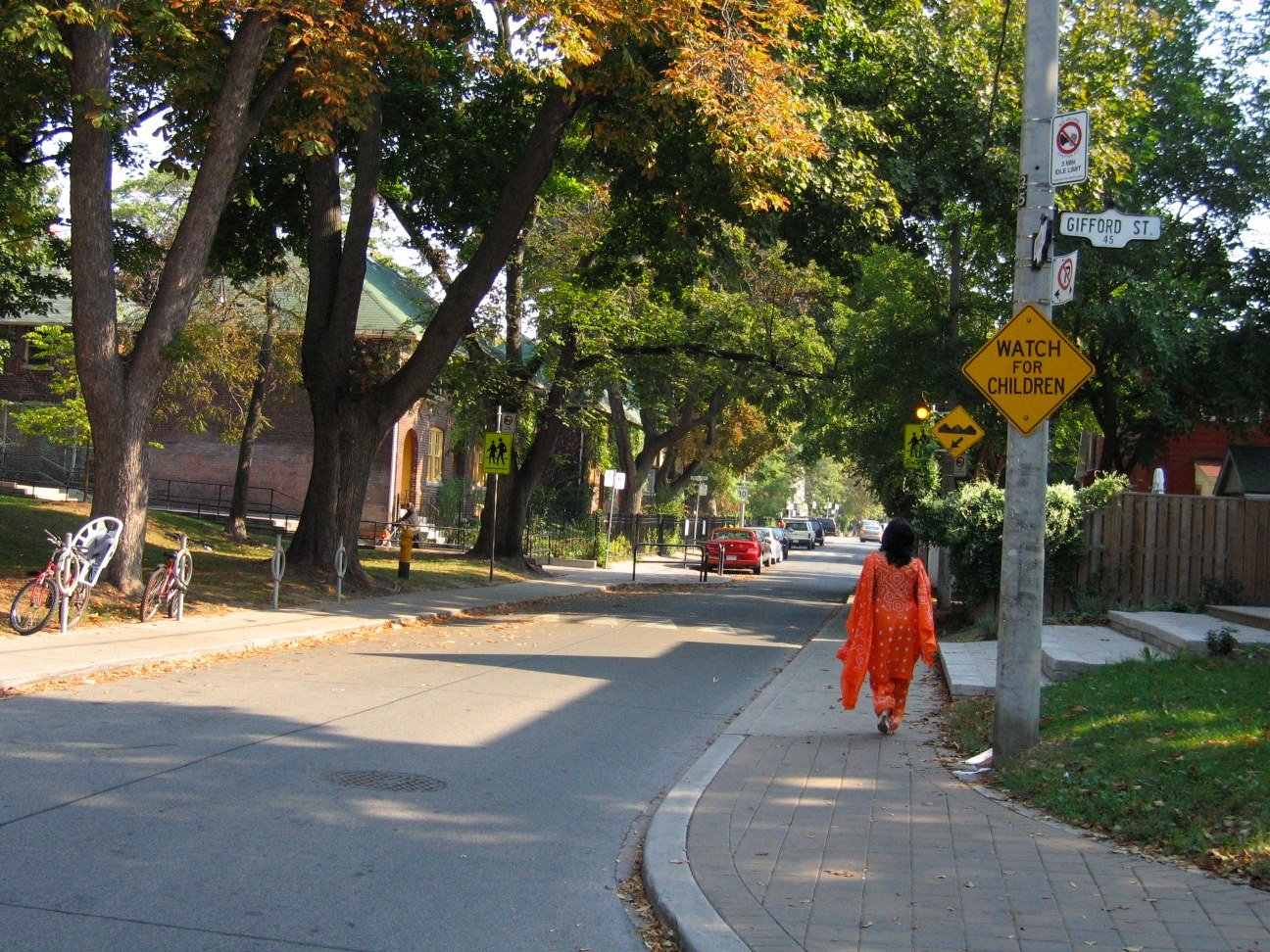
Urban canopy at a Toronto street

With over 75% of Canadians in urban areas, urban forests play an important role in the daily lives of Canadian citizens. Urban forests provide numerous environmental and health benefits to the people of Canada. Over time, the use of urban forestry in Canada has changed. In the 1960s, Erik Jorgensen of the University of Toronto, coined the oxymoronic term "urban forestry" while assisting a master's student with his curriculum. However, after this milestone in the urban forestry community, urban forestry faded to the background with few accounts of urban forestry being practiced.

As urban forestry started gaining recognition globally and the importance of urban forestry was realized, Canada began creating Urban Forest Management Plans (UFMPs). These plans focus on maintenance, improving canopy cover, enhancing tree species diversity, and educational programs, without focus on economic or environmental services urban forests provide. Today, Canada is conducting studies to address the gaps within their urban forestry programs. Because urban forestry is practiced under different departments, labels, and disciplines, the true extent of urban forestry in Canada is unknown.

==== University of Toronto ====
The University of Toronto during the 1960s was home to some of the most significant forest pathology developments of the decade. Two professors at the university (Jorgensen, and media professor Marshall McLuhan), were given the catalyst to pioneer the discipline of "urban forestry" when the crisis of Dutch elm disease threatened 90% elm mono-culture at the university. What made this new discipline different from prior urban tree management strategies was the sense of scale. Prior to the 1960s urban trees were managed on a tree-by-tree basis. The Dutch elm disease finally convinced forest pathologists at the school to consider the urban forest on a systems level, where small changes can create forest-wide effects if not properly managed.

In 1962 this thinking gave Jorgensen a convincing enough argument to secure funding for the world's first "Shade Tree Research Laboratory" in an old dairy plant that the university owned. By 1965 the University of Toronto had its first official urban forestry course, called "the Study of Urban Forestry", taught by Jorgensen. Only one year later department head, Dean Sisam, applied the term to the previously known courses of "arboriculture and parks management", three years following that the university began creating diplomas for urban forestry; producing seven graduates by 1982. The University of Toronto's program has continued and has grown significantly into current times, inspiring many other institutions to offer a similar diploma as the discipline diffused across the globe.

==== Erik Jorgensen ====
Erik Jorgensen began as a forest pathologist for the federal government in Denmark, he then moved to Toronto in 1959 to begin studies on Dutch Elm Disease (DED). Which at the time was spreading through North America at extreme rates and killing thousands of Elm trees in its path. He was a professor of Forest Pathology at the University of Toronto throughout the 1960s. While being interviewed for a newspaper article in 1969 he defined Urban Forestry as "a specialized branch that has as its objective the cultivation and management of city trees". He continued his career at the University of Toronto and his laboratory became increasingly devoted to shade tree research in Canada. Jorgensen continued to define and justify the importance of Urban Forestry through his conference papers published in the Shade Tree Research Laboratory throughout the 1970s and 1980s. He ended up leaving the university in 1973 to lead a National Urban Forestry program in Ottawa, Canada.

=== China ===
==== Urban green space development ====
With a rapidly growing population, China has started developing strategies to improve urban life. The concept "making forests enter cities and making cities embrace forests" has been promoted. The creation of the "National Forest City" title in 2004 has incentivized urban forest development. This program has led to significant positive changes in the quality and quantity of many Chinese cities. Currently, 58 cities have been awarded this title. While changes have been made, inequity of recreational green spaces may still be a challenge. In a case study of Wuhan, China, equal distribution of greenspaces was found, but there was unequal distribution of public parks. These findings suggest that some social groups and populations cannot equally enjoy the recreational and health benefits of these public greenspaces.

==== Nanjing ====
Nanjing Vertical Forest Project, designed by Stefano Boeri of Stefano Boeri Architetti, consists of two towers: one 200 meter tower that will hold office spaces, a museum, a rooftop club, and a green architecture school while the other 108-meter tower that will include a Hyatt hotel and swimming pool. With construction now complete, native trees, shrubs, and perennials are being installed. 600 tall trees, 200 medium-sized trees and 2,500 cascading plants and shrubs will be planted on the building facades. It is expected to absorb 18 tonnes of CO_{2} while providing 16,5 tonnes of oxygen annually.

==== Shanghai ====
A 99 km long and 100 m wide forest belt surrounding the city of Shanghai was completed in 2003. The heat island issue has been significantly reduced.

Another pilot project by Shanghai Municipal Agricultural Commission aims to convert 35% of the total area of Shanghai to urban forest. A forest network of two rings, eight lines, five zones, multi-corridors, multi-grids, and one chain was introduced in the project, which means planting two ring-shaped forests, an inner ring 500 m wide by 97 km in length surrounding the central district, and an outer ring 180 km long in suburban land, eight longitudinal forest belts 1000 m wide along expressways and major rivers, five large forest parks about 30 km2 each in area scattered in the suburbs, multiple green corridors 25 to 500 m, grids of forests along the seashore and in industrial areas, and one chain linking various habitats.

=== Japan ===
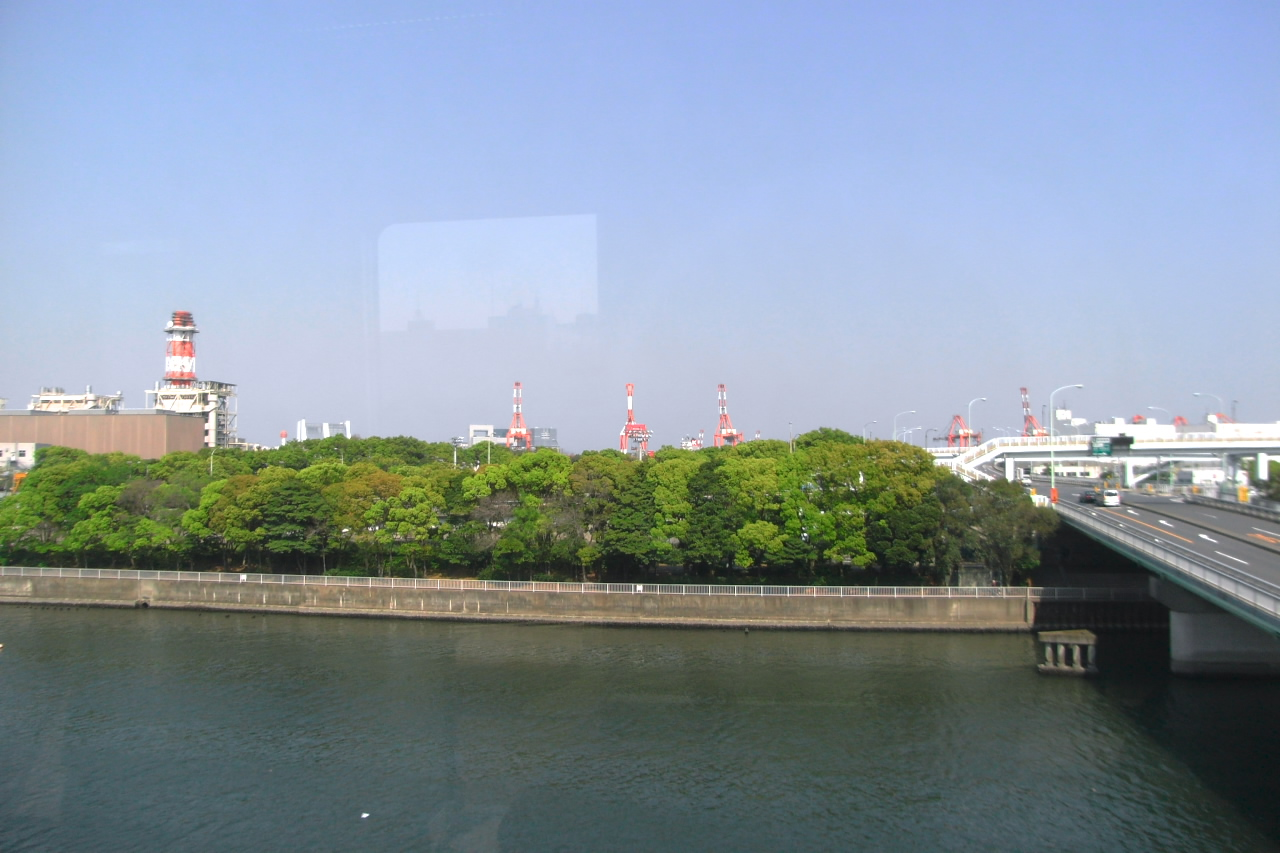
A forested region lining the Tokyo monorail planted to dampen noise and air pollution

In recent years, there has been significant national effort to deploy urban reforestation research initiatives in Japanese metropolitan areas. The current research evaluates tree count, species richness, and carbon sequestration capacity. The Tokyo area has planted 420,563 trees bordering 2,712 kilometers of streets. In 4,177 ha of urban parks in Tokyo, there are over 1.5 million trees planted. The urban forest in Tokyo is managed by the Japan Greenery Research and Development Center Foundation since 1973.

The first planting of camphor trees alongside rural roads is estimated to have happened around the 3rd Century (AD). The first record of government policy ordering roadside tree planting was in 759 AD. Cherry, willow, and Japanese pagoda trees were planted adjacent Kyoto streets by the 9th century. In the Ginza area, cherry and pine trees were planted along sidewalks 5 meters apart in 1873. The growth of these trees, however, was unhealthy, so they were replaced with Shidareyanagi willow trees in 1880. Japanese maple was also one of the most popularly planted species. In 1907, the city of Tokyo did a massive urban planting of the most healthy and dependable street trees that had survived. Historically, the ginkgo was first a widely successful and popular street tree in Tokyo, which is why the tree is now planted along streets and in parks around the world.

In the late 1960s, street trees were used to solve urban environmental issues, such as air and noise pollution. The Tokyo Olympic Games also gave the government a valid reason to plant more trees in the city. There were 12,000 street trees planted in Tokyo by 1965. The species composition of street trees changed dramatically from 1980 to 1996. Dogwood, cherry, and Japanese zelkova trees skyrocketed in popularity and were extensively planted. There were 420,564 street trees planted in Tokyo by 1997.

=== Israel ===
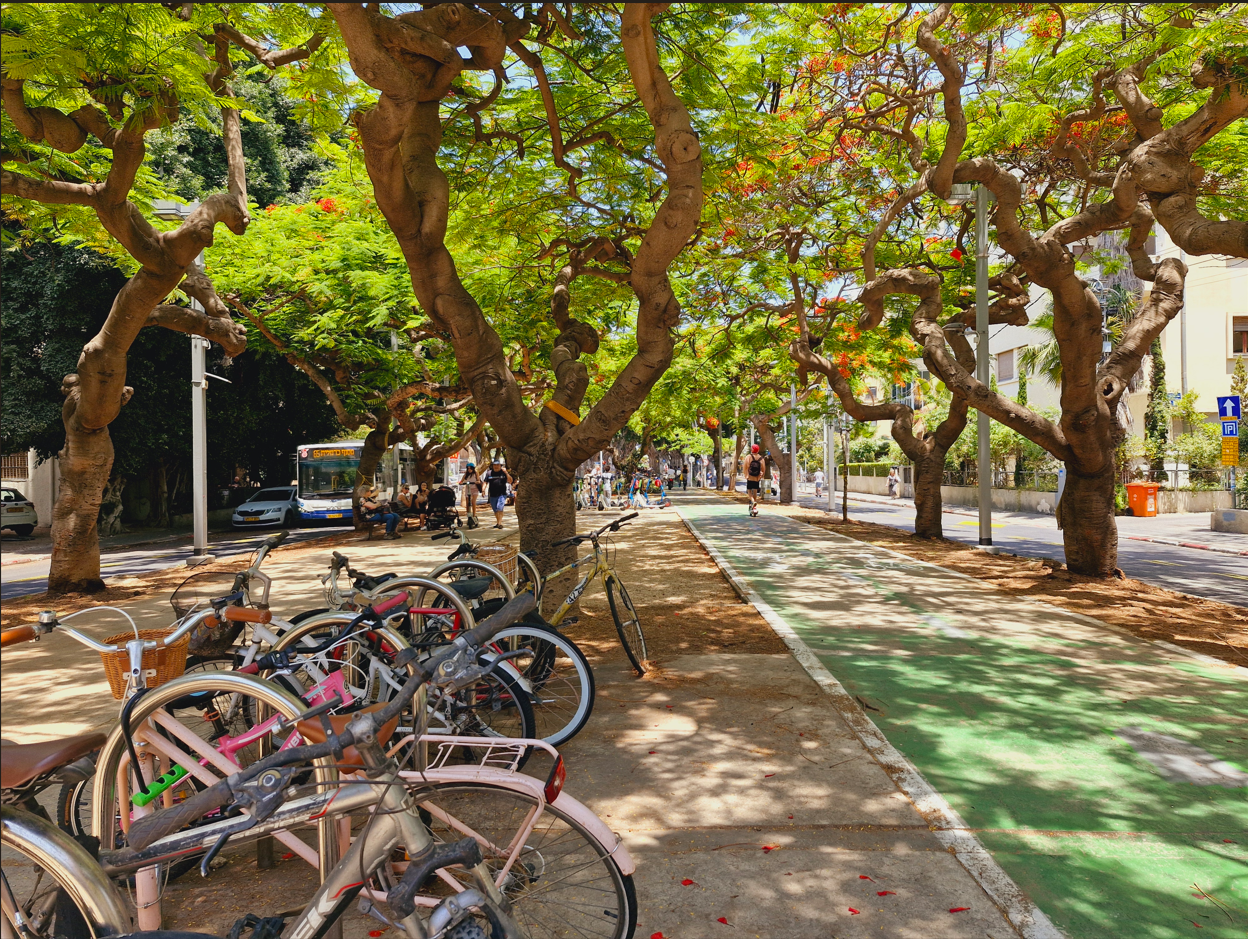
Delonix Regia in Rothschild Boulevard, Tel Aviv, Israel.

Israeli cities suffer from increasing heat due to climate change. Some cities have a severe lack of shade, thus leading to severe heat stress.

In 2024, the city of Sderot was selected as a pilot site for applying the principles of urban forestry in Israel. According to Noam Bar-Levi, director of the "Derech Tzel" ("Path of Shade") organization, Israeli cities face a significant shortage of shaded areas and are increasingly affected by rising urban temperatures. According to the planners, establishing an urban forest in Sderot will enhance residents’ quality of life and help the city adapt to the impacts of the climate crisis. Urban forests provide natural shading and contribute to lowering ambient temperatures in densely built environments.

The initiative, led by the "Derech Tzel" nonprofit organization, is jointly funded by the Nadiv Foundation and the Israeli government. The environmental group "Vontaat" is also involved in the project. The program, known as "Sderot Forest City", envisions transforming Sderot into a greener urban landscape. According to a report by Channel 13, the project will include planting fruit trees and establishing community vegetable gardens along city streets, allowing residents to harvest produce for personal consumption.

=== India ===
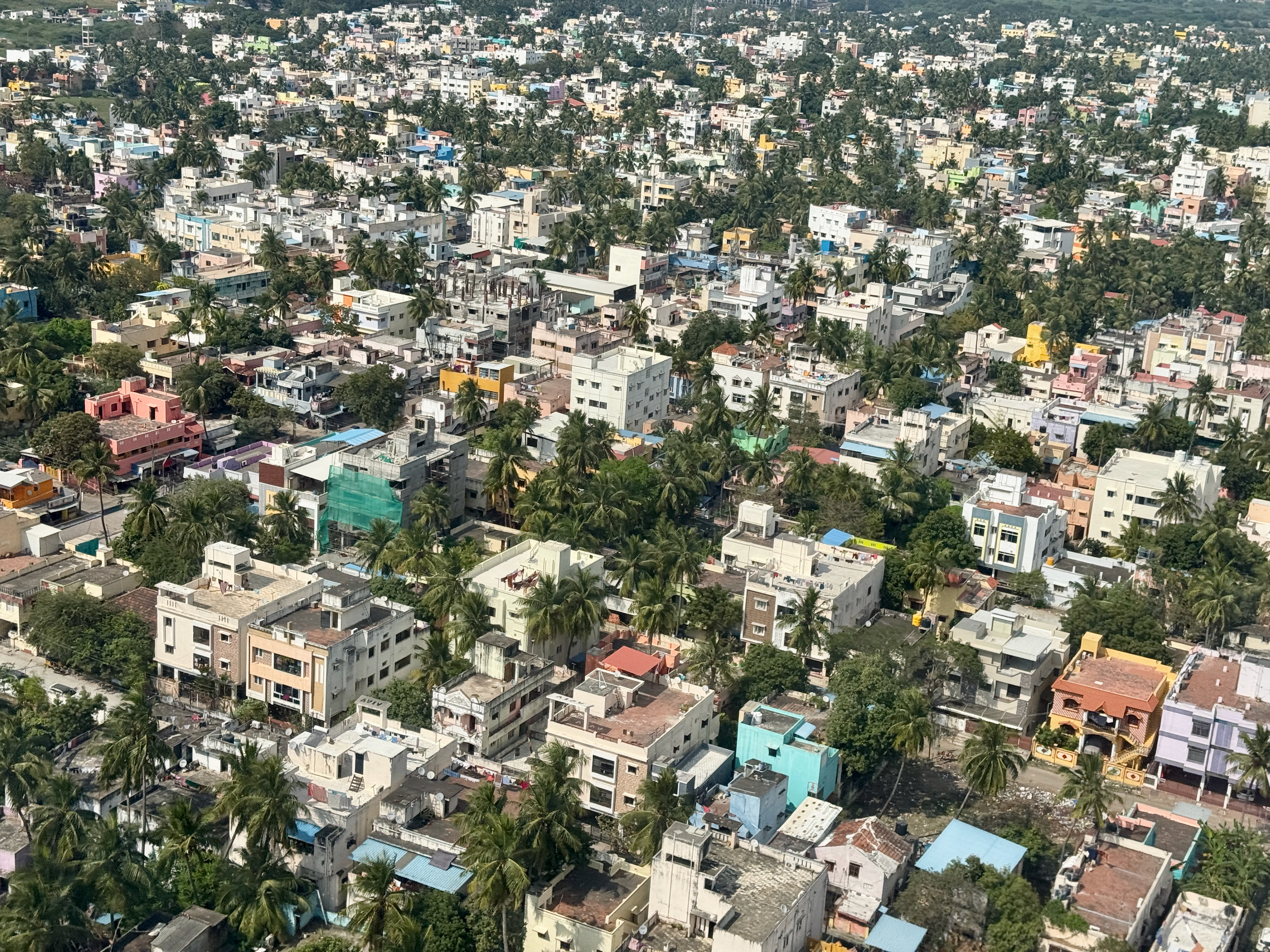
Urban canopy over Chennai.

The majority of Indian cities excluding Chandigarh and Gandhinagar, have very low urban forest availability per capita compared to U.S., Australian, and European cities. There are, however, strong urban forestation initiatives in New Delhi, the capital of India. Currently, 20% of landcover in Delhi is green space. The parks and garden society is newly in charge of urban forestry initiatives. Two biodiversity parks and nine city forests have been constructed in Delhi, and there are still nine more city forests in the planning process. Roads in Dehli are identified by trees species planted beside them (e.g. Vigyan path with Toona ciliata).

Tree planting is promoted in the Gujarat state through association with religious practices in numerous belief systems. In the Puranas (religious Hindu text), each planet, constellation, and zodiac has its own preferred tree. Planting these trees is said to benefit human life and luck. In Gandhinagar city, six ha of land is planted with trees acknowledging these religious beliefs. It is a dedicated space for giving life and love to the trees for health and prosperity of the forest.

==== The Kerwa Forest Area ====
A case study performed on the Kerwa Forest Area, 10 km from the city of Bhopal, India, evaluated the effects of human impact and capacity of ecosystems services. Bhopal's swift urbanization has negatively impacted ecosystems in the Kerfa Forest Area. Due to human impacts, there were very few ecosystem services such as carbon sequestration and biodiversity conservation, that were evident enough to be measured in the study. The forest is still able to filter stormwater and provide stable drinking water supplies for Bhopal city residents. 40% of Bhopal citizens rely on the Upper Lake, a reservoir that sits in a region of the Kerfa Forest, for drinking water. Forest degradation has increased runoff from the Kerwa Forest Area, which alters water quality in the lake. Direct overland flow transports excess nutrients from adjacent agricultural fields to the lake, which causes eutrophication and reduces lake biodiversity. The Kerfa Forest Area is under critical environmental stress and supplies ecosystem services necessary to the health and wellbeing of Bhopal residents.

==== Carbon sequestration potential ====
Native tree species in India have a large potential for carbon sequestration in urban areas with high greenhouse gas concentrations. A highly productive species of teak trees (T. grandis) can sequester more carbon in less time than other native trees. Planting T. grandis in areas undergoing rapid urbanization can act as carbon sinks for excess carbon dioxide emissions. A mix of native species, however, is often ecologically more valuable and will provide more ecosystem services.

=== Scandinavia ===
==== History ====
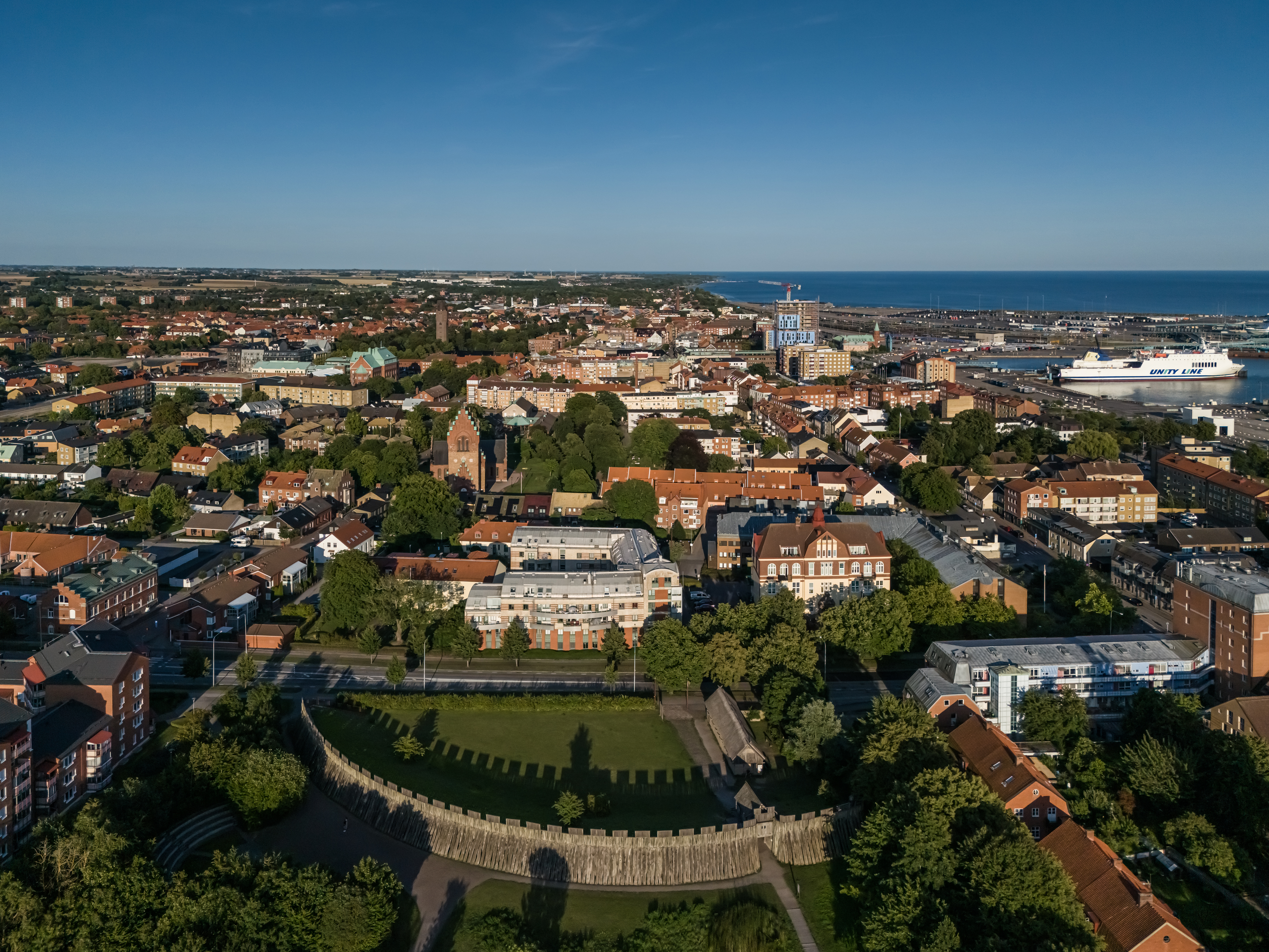
Urban canopy over Trelleborg, Sweden

Following urbanization in Europe, rapid city expansion resulted in forests being kept to the edge of cities, making the only urban greenspaces privately owned by monarchs, religious establishments, and other positions of power. Over time, as democracies began to emerge, the public was able to express interest in public recreational areas. Urban forest development was initially dictated by the wealthy and upper class society, yet in the second half of the 19th century, direct government intervention increased.

At the same time, more urban greenspaces began opening to the public. The development of urban greenspaces led to a need for management of these areas, leading to the urban forester professions becoming commonplace. Forestry experts then became more involved in forest and green services management as localities and national forest services became responsible for these areas.

==== Practices ====
According to a study published in the Scandinavian Journal of Forest Research, an average of 53% of forest lands within any Danish municipality are owned by the municipality itself. While this number varies respectively as the size of a municipality increases and decreases, this average serves as a general statistic. When compared to the other Scandinavian countries, Denmark's municipalities are unique in that they regularly buy and sell land to the private sector. This exchange of land results in various owners of the green spaces that reside within Denmark's urbanized areas. Only around a quarter of municipalities in Denmark have woodland policies in place for managing their urban forests. The others either have a stand-alone policy (around 20%), or no policy at all (roughly 30%).

In fairly recent years, the budget for parks and tree maintenance in most places seem to be steadily dwindling. Sweden as well has transitioned into more of a conservation and active management mindset. In Sweden, the urban forests and green spaces are classified into five zones based on size and use. After classification, recommendations for future improvements and management strategies are formed. In addition to urban zone classification, the use of i-tree inventory is also used for the assessment and management planning of their urban green spaces. Swedish municipalities are constantly innovating and adapting their managing strategies for the old growth forests in central urban areas and the younger forests on the outskirts.

==== Composition ====
Most of the species in Scandinavian urban forests are native, with a majority of people stating their preference for native species. Common species include Norway spruce (Picea abies), Scots pine (Pinus sylvestris), silver birch (Betula pendula), and moor birch (Betula pubescens). Urban forests also tend to be fairly irregular in age and tree placement, however general favor tends to be shown towards older trees. Visibility is rated as a priority in the design of these places, and is a common issue faced by managing officials. Between surveys conducted across Finland, Denmark, and Sweden, approximately 53% of urban canopy cover is managed directly by municipal governments, while the rest is under private ownership.

=== South Africa ===
==== History ====
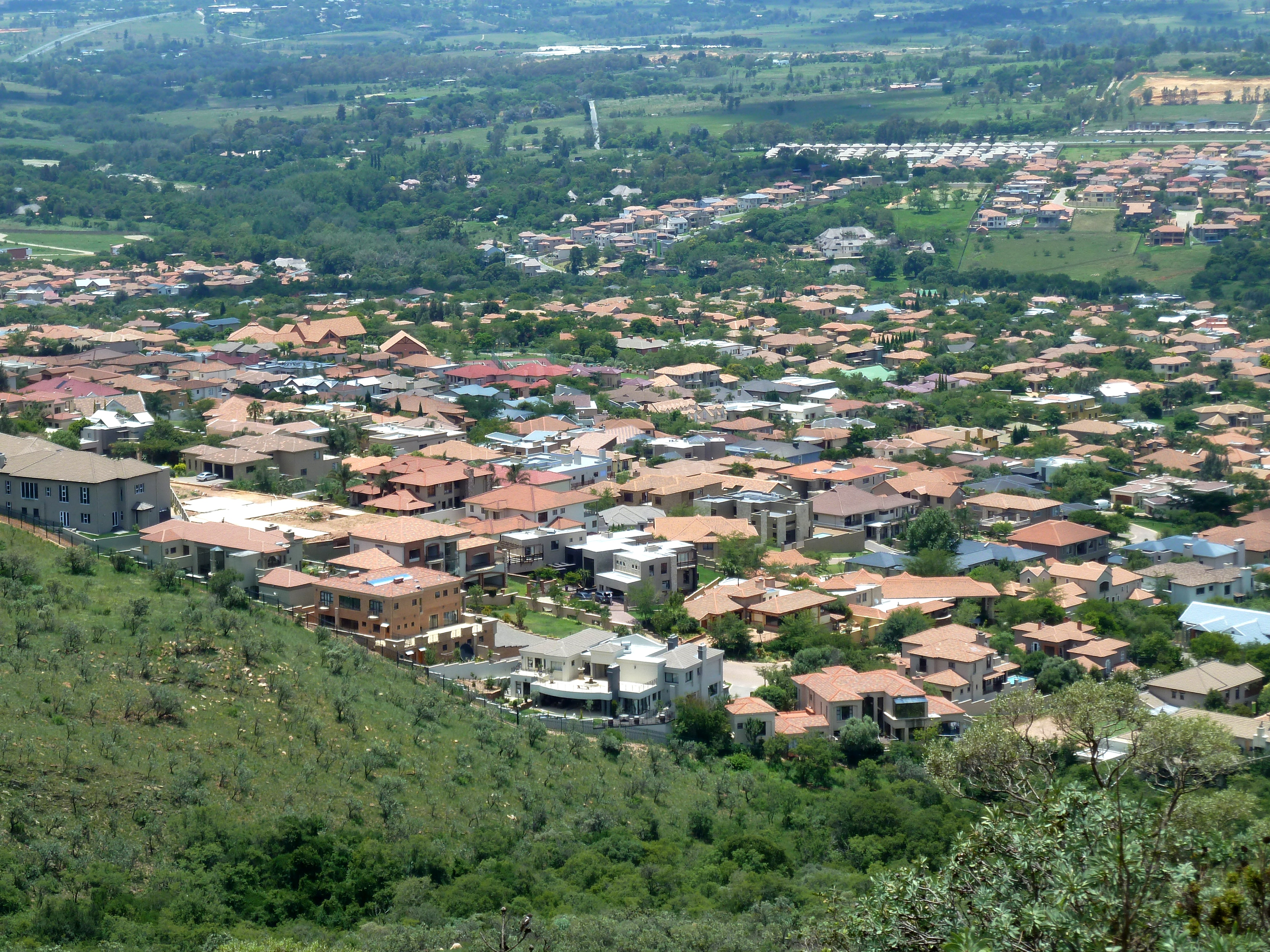
Urban tree canopy at an estate in the Gauteng Province, South Africa

Cape Town's indigenous flora, fynbos, is characterized by low-lying shrubbery with few trees. In response to the Cape's natural timber deficiency, alien tree species were introduced during the Dutch occupation, beginning in 1652, to support a growing population and economy. Foreign settlers planted trees in cities, alongside new roads and around private dwellings. Compelled by the need to support a growing population and economy, Cape foresters developed new methods for growing exotic trees in the new climate. These methods, which began in the Cape, later spread to other South African colonies. Many South African towns remain characterized by road-side rows of exotic trees, which were planted from as early as the 17th century.

=== United Kingdom ===
In the UK urban forestry was pioneered around the turn of the 19th century by the Midland Reafforesting Association, whose focus was in the Black Country. England's Community Forests program was established in 1990 by the then Countryside Commission as a pilot project to demonstrate the potential contribution of environmental improvement to economic and social regeneration. Each Community Forest was established as a partnership between local authorities and local, regional and national partners including the Forestry Commission and Natural England. Collectively, this work has formed the largest environmental regeneration initiative in England. In the mid-1990s the National Urban Forestry Unit (NUFU) grew out of a Black Country Urban Forestry Unit and promoted urban forestry across the UK, notably including the establishment of the Black Country Urban Forest. As urban forestry become more mainstream in the 21st century, NUFU was wound up, and its advocacy role is now carried on by organisations such as The Wildlife Trusts and the Woodland Trust.

=== United States ===
==== History ====
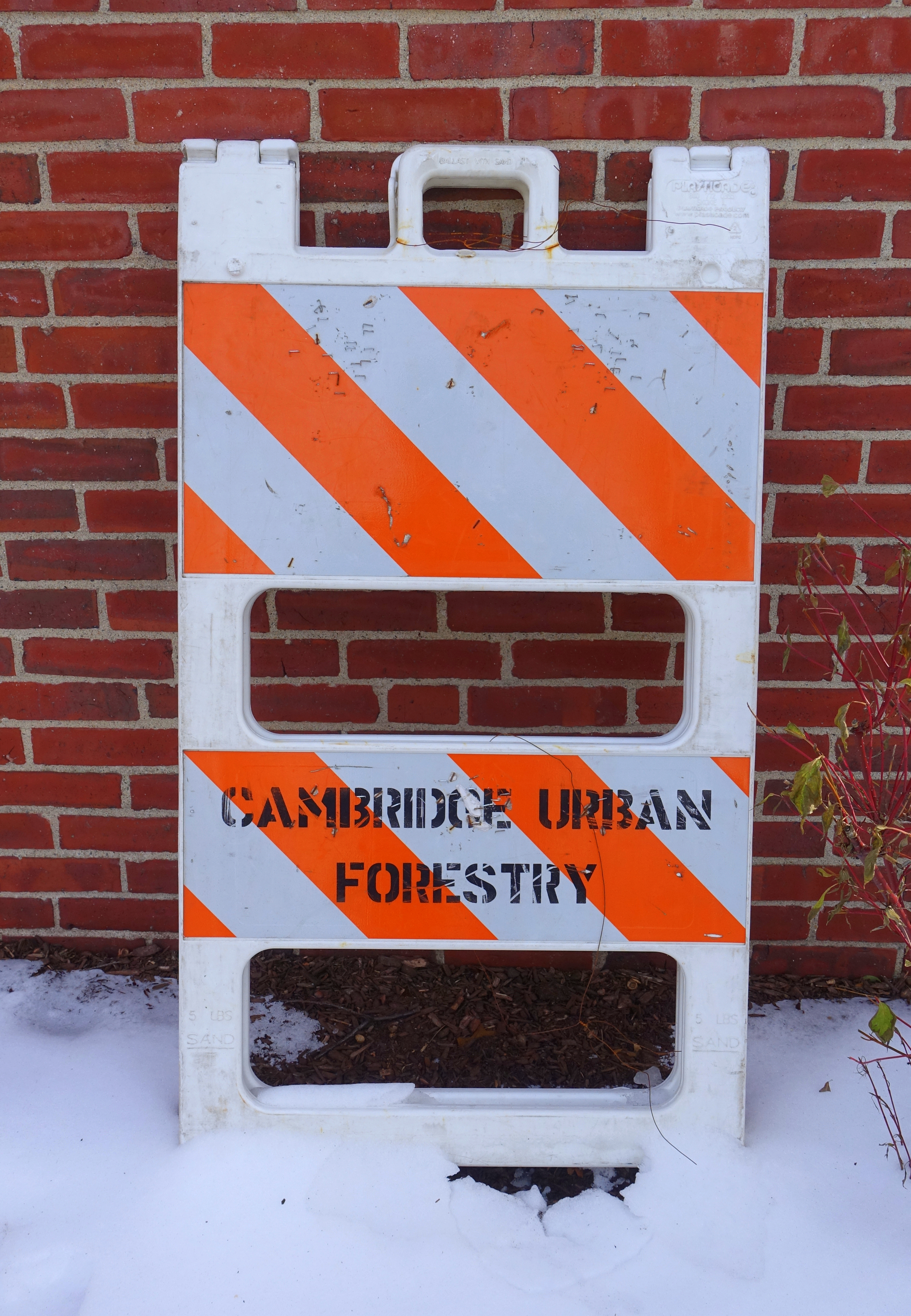
Cambridge Urban Forestry (Massachusetts)

Tree warden laws in the New England states are important examples of some of the earliest and most far-sighted state urban forestry and forest conservation legislation. In 1896, the Massachusetts legislature passed the first tree warden law, and the other five New England states soon followed suit: Connecticut, Rhode Island, and New Hampshire in 1901, Vermont in 1904, and Maine in 1919. (Kinney 1972, Favretti 1982, Campanella 2003).

As villages and towns grew in population and wealth, ornamentation of public, or common, spaces with shade trees also increased. However, the ornamentation of public areas did not evolve into a social movement until the late 18th century, when private individuals seriously promoted and sponsored public beautification with shade and ornamental trees (Favretti 1982, Lawrence 1995). Almost a century later, around 1850, institutions and organization were founded to promote ornamentation through private means (Egleston 1878, Favretti 1982). In the 1890s, New England's "Nail" laws enabled towns to take definitive steps to distinguish which shade trees were public. Chapter 196 of the 1890 Massachusetts Acts and Resolves stated that a public shade tree was to be designated by driving a nail or spike, with the letter M plainly impressed on its head, into the relevant trunk. Connecticut passed a similar law in 1893, except its certified nails and spikes bore the letter C. (Northrup 1887).

The rapid urbanization of American cities in the late 19th century was a concern to many as encouraging intellectual separation of humanity and nature (Rees 1997). By the end of the 19th century, social reformers were just beginning to understand the relationship between developing parks in urban areas and "[engendering] a better society" (Young 1995:536). At this time, parks and trees were not necessarily seen as a way to allow urban dwellers to experience nature, but more of a means of providing mechanisms of acculturation and control for newly arrived immigrants and their children (e.g., areas to encourage "structured play" and thus serve as a deterrent for youth crime) (Pincetl and Gearin 2005). Other prominent public intellectuals were interested in exploring the synergy between ecological and social systems, including American landscape architect Frederick Law Olmsted, designer of 17 major U.S. urban parks and a visionary in seeing the value of including green space and trees as a fundamental part of metropolitan infrastructure (Young 2009). To Olmsted, unity between nature and urban dwellers was not only physical, but also spiritual: "Gradually and silently the charm comes over us; the beauty has entered our souls; we know not exactly when or how, but going away we remember it with a tender, subdued, filial-like joy" (Beveridge and Schuyler 1983 cited in Young 2009:320).

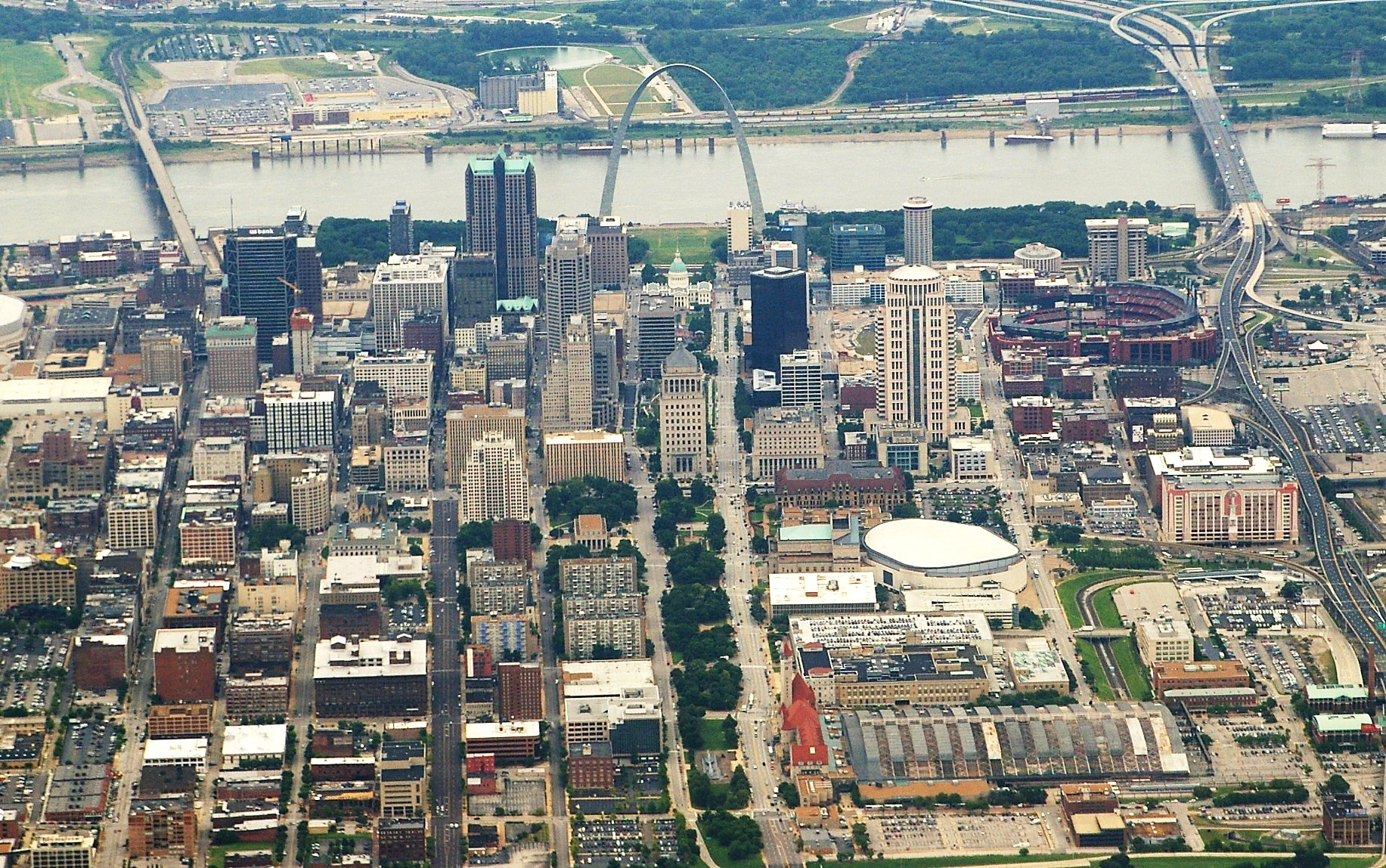
This aerial image of St. Louis, Missouri, shows the urban tree canopy of the central city, and the greenspace where the Gateway Arch is located.

The conscious inclusion of trees in urban designs for American cities such as Chicago, San Francisco, and Minneapolis was also inspired by Paris's urban forest and its broad, tree-lined boulevards as well as by the English romantic landscape movement (Zube 1973). The belief in green cover by early park proponents as a promoter of social cohesion has been corroborated by more recent research that links trees to the presence of stronger ties among neighbors, more adult supervision of children in outdoor areas, more use of the neighborhood common areas, and fewer property and violent crime (Kuo et al. 1998, Kuo and Sullivan 2001, Kuo 2003).

Many municipalities throughout the United States employ community-level tree ordinances to empower planning officials to regulate the planting, maintenance, and preservation of trees. The development of tree ordinances emerged largely as a response to the Dutch elm disease that plagued cities from the 1930s to 1960s, and grew in response to urban development, loss of urban tree canopy, and rising public concern for the environment (Wolf 2003). The 1980s saw the beginning of the second generation of ordinances with higher standards and specific foci, as communities sought to create more environmentally pleasing harmony between new development and existing infrastructure. These new ordinances, legislated by local governments, may include specific provisions such as the diameter of tree and percentage of trees to be protected during construction activities (Xiao 1995). The implementation of these tree ordinances is greatly aided by a significant effort by community tree advocates to conduct public outreach and education aimed at increasing environmental concern for urban trees, such as through National Arbor Day celebrations and the USDA Urban and Community Forestry Program (Dwyer et al. 2000, Hunter and Rinner 2004, Norton and Hannon 1997, Wall et al. 2006). Much of the work on the ground is performed by non-profits funded by private donations and government grants.

Policy on urban forestry is less contentious and partisan than many other forestry issues, such as resource extraction in national forests. However, the uneven distribution of healthy urban forests across the landscape has become a growing concern in the past 20 years. This is because the urban forest has become an increasingly important component of bioregional ecological health with the expanding ecological footprint of urban areas. Based on American Forests' Urban Ecosystem Analyses conducted over the past six years in ten cities, an estimated 634,407,719 trees have been lost from metropolitan areas across the U.S. as the result of urban and suburban development. This is often due to the failure of municipalities to integrate trees and other elements of the green infrastructure into their day-to-day planning and decision-making processes (American Forests 2002). The inconsistent quality of urban forestry programs on the local level ultimately impacts the regional context in which contiguous urban forests reside, and is greatly exacerbated by suburban sprawl as well as other social and ecological effects (Webb et al. 2008). The recognition of this hierarchical linkage among healthy urban forests and the effectiveness of broader ecosystem protection goals (e.g., maintaining biodiversity and wildlife corridors), highlights the need for scientists and policymakers to gain a better understanding of the socio-spatial dynamics that are associated with tree canopy health at different scales.

==== Wardens ====
The New England created urban forestry policies that laid the foundation for urban areas everywhere. Initially, surface level policies, such as Nail laws and the introduction of tree wardens, were created to protect street trees. Nail laws consisted of placing a nail in street trees to mark them as part of the city's responsibility. The nails also served as a protection method from citizens that wanted to either cut these trees down or cause them any harm. Tree wardens were required in Massachusetts starting in 1896 to protect these urban trees. Other New England states quickly followed suit. Each municipality was required to have their own tree warden, someone who was knowledgeable enough about trees to decide how to properly care for them. Some larger municipalities paid these wardens, but many of the smaller municipalities had to recruit volunteers for this position. The wardens' job is to protect the trees and at once protect the public from the trees. Even though shade trees can be perceived as harmless they can also cause risks to the safety of the public. It is the job of the warden to make sure they preserve as many trees as possible, while keeping the public safe.

The responsibilities of tree wardens have grown and shifted over the years. While each municipality has a tree warden in charge of overseeing the urban forest, they have less time to manage each individual tree. That being said, tree wardens are required to approve the pruning and trimming of any public tree. However, they need not be as involved. Rather than needing the tree warden to be present when the tree is maintained, now there are certified arborists and educational programs, so the tree warden can feel at ease about other people and companies maintaining the trees that he or she approves. The scope of their jobs has increased in modern times. While wardens used to primarily ensure that street trees were cared for and did not cause problems, now they have to worry about the entire urban forest. This includes a great deal of planning and following countless regulations.

As society has progressed and the technology has improved, the roles of tree wardens have adapted. For instance, power lines have become a large issue for public trees and the development of utility forestry has been immense. Wardens now create relationships with utility foresters to ensure they follow the requirements for proper spacing between the lines and public trees. Also, tree wardens and urban forest ordinances are no longer restricted to New England. They now span across the entire United States. While they generally follow similar guidelines, their policies can vary quite a bit. In order to keep policies fairly uniform, the introduction of the Tree City USA program was created by the Arbor Day Foundation in 1976.

=== Australia ===
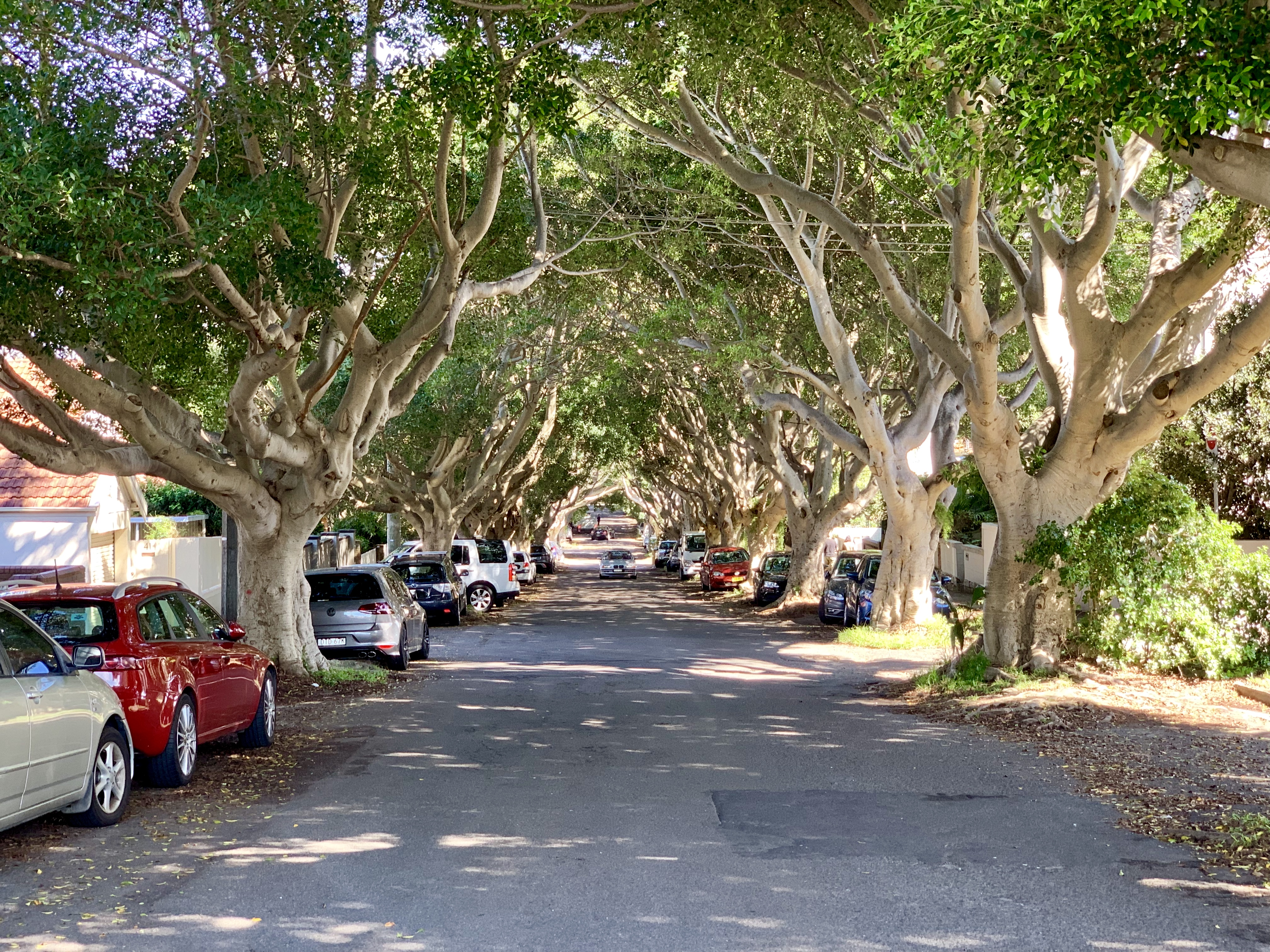
Tree-lined street Bronte, New South Wales.

Australian urban forestry involves the care and management of single trees and tree populations throughout urban Australia, ameliorating the livability of cities in the country. The establishment and progression of urban forestry in Australia have helped alleviate the impacts of the country's harsh climatic conditions in urban areas. The present focus is on improving tree species adaptability, resiliency, and diversity to continue providing similar benefits in a future of increasingly harsh climatic conditions.

==== History ====
The first calls for conserving woodland areas in and around cities arose in the 1970s in response to increasing urbanisation and the consequent demand for recreational green space and awareness of protecting native wildlife. BOBITS – bits of bush in the suburbs – was a popular term at the time to describe these early "simplified versions of Australia's native forests" that flourished in Australian cities by the ecologist policies of the then prime minister Bob Hawke, summarised in its 1988 Greenhouse 21C: A Plan of Action for a Sustainable Future strategy to reduce greenhouse gas emissions.

This and many other efforts to implement urban forestry in Australia were stimulated by CSIRO forester John French, drawing inspiration from ongoing efforts in North America. Australia's understanding of urban forestry evolved during the second period to include all spaces used by the urban population. Known as a "city forest" this vision of urban forestry incorporated the economic value of urban trees and a focus on ecosystem services. The third and present period in Australia's urban forestry history is known as "city in a forest", and considers the ongoing efforts to include urban forestry as a solution to environmental and health problems.

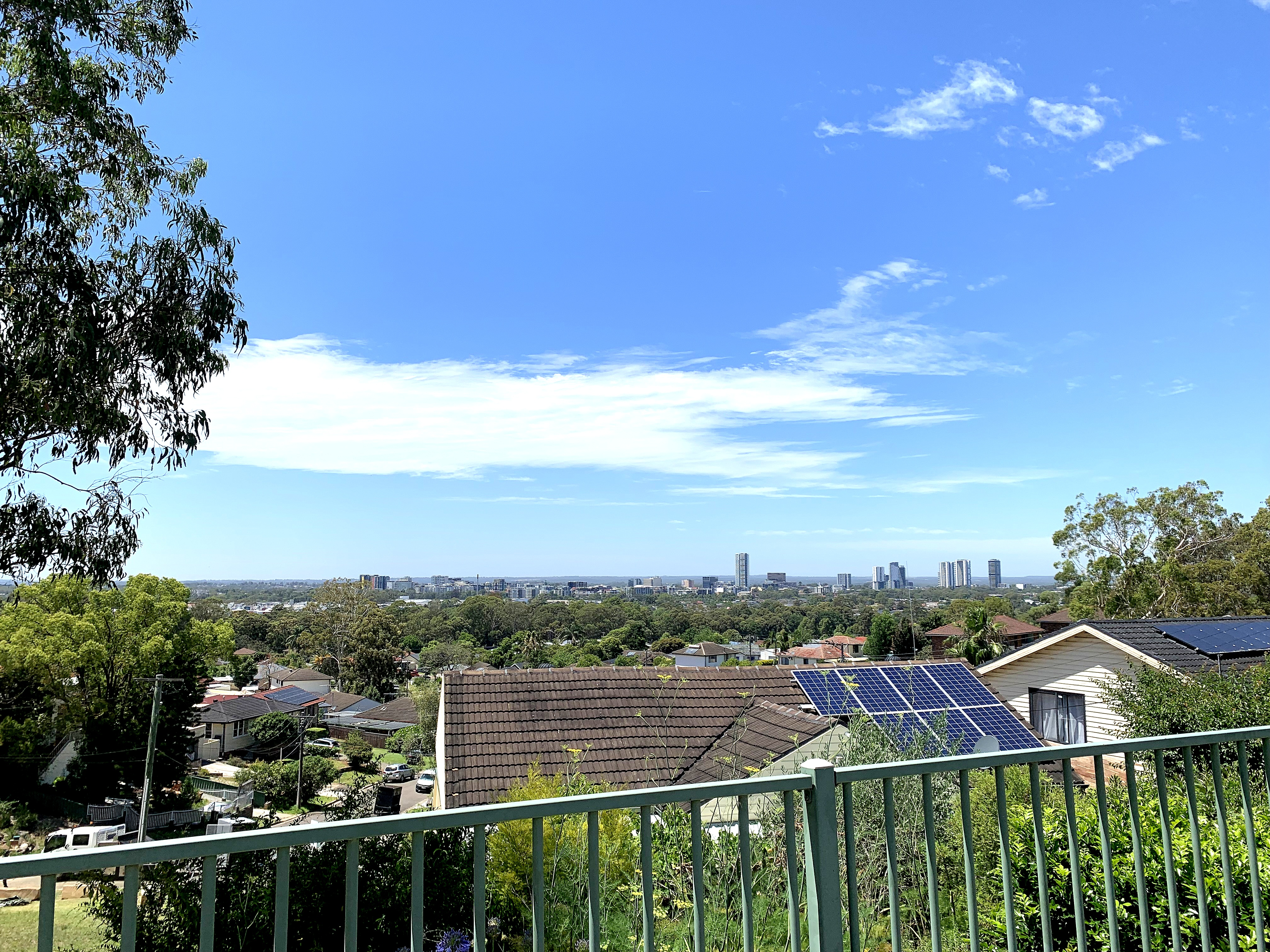
Urban tree canopy of Liverpool, New South Wales and surrounding suburbs.

==== Climate challenges ====
Complications of global climate change are exacerbated within certain regions of Australia based on location and exposure to climate factors. Australia is susceptible to variable climatic intensities due to the Southern Annular Mode (SAM), a dynamic circulation pattern promoting warm and dry conditions via cold front redirection. Such conditions intensify standalone climate change challenges, particularly throughout the southern half of Australia.

Since nearly 90% of Australians inhabit urban areas, adaptable, efficient and cost-effective methods of climate change mitigation may limit negative human consequences. Establishing, maintaining and retaining trees and shrubs in the urban environment is a nature-based solution with potential to mitigate some impacts that climate change has on Australia's urban population. Municipalities in Australia are exploring the benefits of urban forestry for their regional needs.

===== Canberra =====
A 2020 study of Australia's capital, Canberra, explored opportunities for living infrastructure to mitigate conditions like increasing temperature and drought. The authors identified urban forests as one of four kinds of living infrastructure with the potential to provide ecosystem services like cooling, carbon sequestration, and improved livability. While hopeful that a high-quality urban forest can provide these benefits, the authors emphasized the importance of planning and collaboration across diverse stakeholders for successful implementation.

===== Adelaide =====
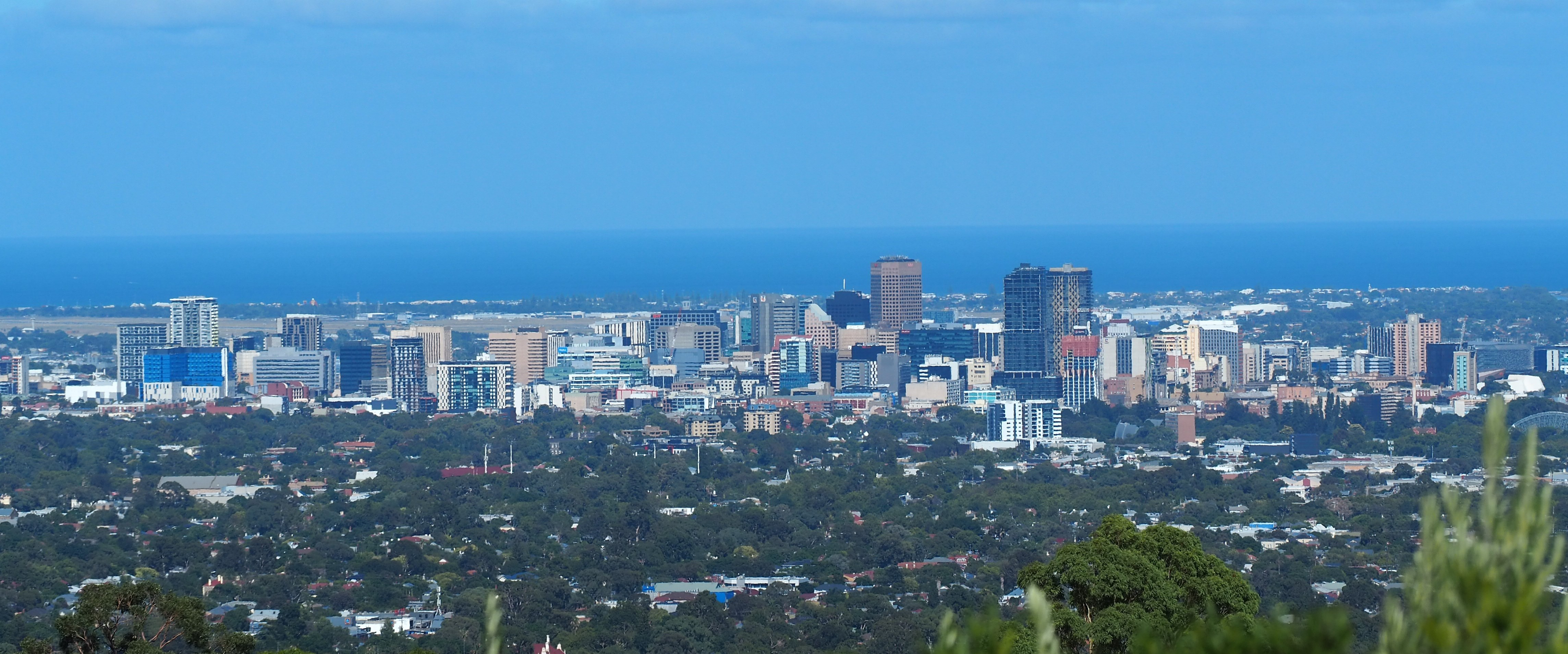
Widespread urban tree cover, as shown above in Adelaide, South Australia, is one method of effective climate change mitigation in urban areas.

Adelaide, located in South Australia's driest state, examined the potential of green roofs to combat the urban heat island effect. The study found that providing 30% green roof coverage significantly reduced temperature, electricity usage, and cost. Researchers concluded that green roofs and similar green infrastructure have the potential to mitigate urban heat island effects in this region.

However, climate change impacts also bring challenges to the existing urban forest. A 2019 study of 22 southeastern Australian suburbs showed that over half (53%) of the existing tree species were vulnerable to heat and/or moisture stress. A study of 2017 tree health decline in Melbourne found significant negative relationships between tree health and climate conditions for every species studied. Researchers concluded that drought was the primary factor inducing decline, increasing tree vulnerability to secondary stressors like pests. Researchers emphasized a need for planting trees that are better suited to the region, given predictions of hotter and drier conditions in the coming years.

==== Ongoing efforts ====
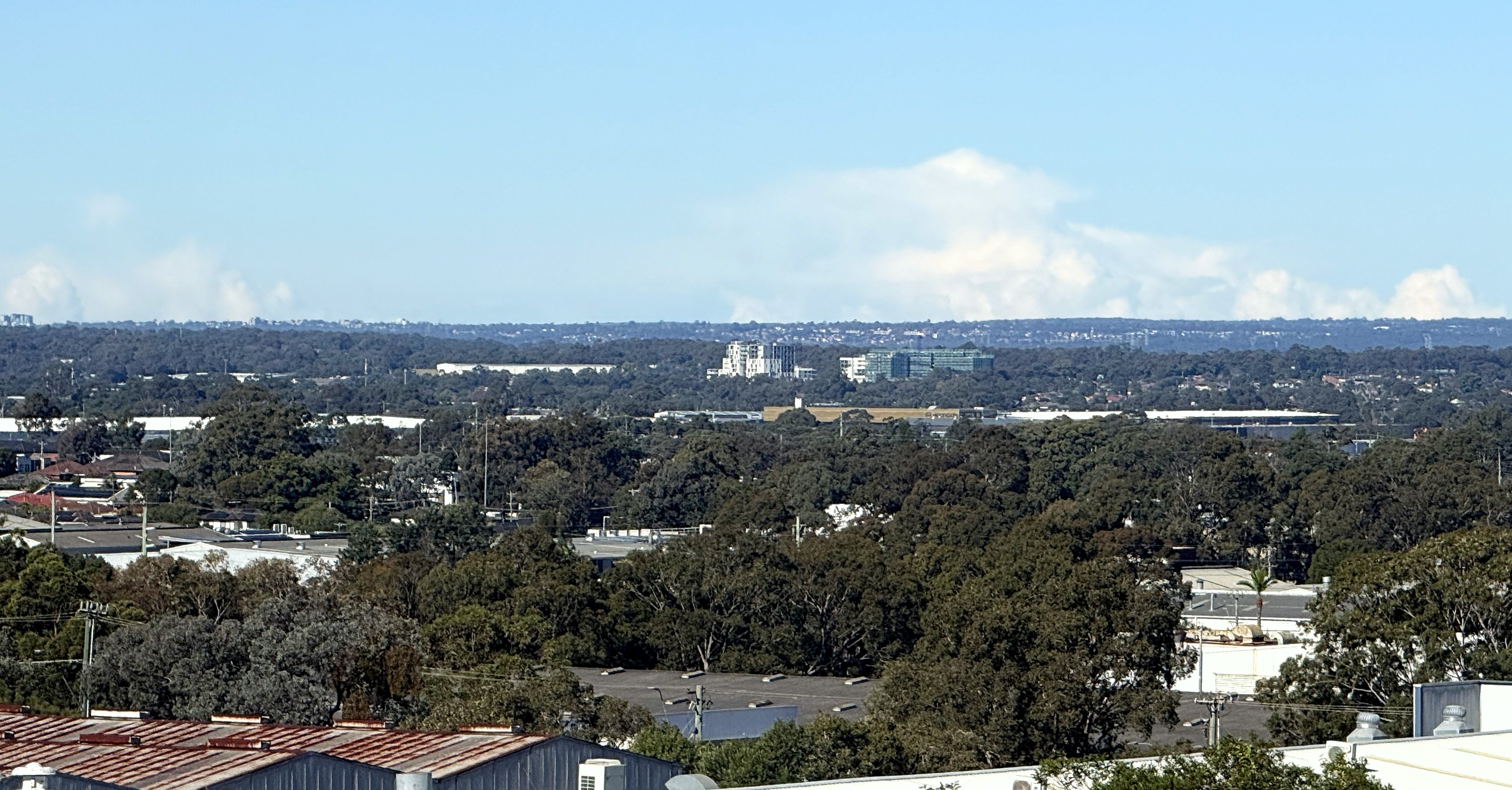
View across the Cumberland Plain, showing the extensive urban tree canopy that forms a prominent feature of the Greater Sydney landscape.

Australian cities have outlined urban forestry initiatives and visions to guide future regulation of climate change challenges, as seen in the 2014 Urban Forestry Strategy Guide. Cities have set goals to double tree canopy coverage and encourage tree species biodiversity by monitoring taxonomic composition of urban forests.

=== Constraints ===
Resolving limitations will require coordinated efforts among cities, regions, and countries (Meza, 1992; Nilsson, 2000; Valencia, 2000).

- Loss of green space is continuous as cities expand and densification occurs; available growing space is limited in city centres. This problem is compounded by pressure to convert green space, parks, etc. into building sites (Glickman, 1999).
- Inadequate space is allowed for the root system. Research indicates that healthy large maturing trees require approximately 1,000 cubic feet of soil.
- Poor soil is used when planting specimens.
- Incorrect and neglected staking or usage of tree shelters leads to bark damage.
- Larger, more mature trees are often used to provide scale and a sense of establishment to a scheme. These trees grow more slowly and do not thrive in alien soils whilst smaller specimens can adapt more readily to existing conditions.
- Lack of information on the tolerances of urban tree cultivars to environmental constraints.
- Poor tree selection which leads to problems in the future
- Poor nursery stock and failure of post-care
- Limited genetic diversity of the tree stock planted (especially the planting of clonal material)
- Too few communities have working tree inventories and very few have urban forest management plans.
- Lack of public awareness about the benefits of healthy urban forests.
- Poor tree care practices by citizens and untrained arborists.

== Organizations ==
- American Forests
- Casey Trees
- Friends of the Urban Forest
- Greening of Detroit
- Hantz Woodlands
- International Society of Arboriculture
- National Urban Forestry Unit
- Society of American Foresters

== See also ==
- Arboriculture
- European Arboricultural Council
- Forestry
- Garden city movement
- Horticulture
- i-Tree
- Landscape architecture
- Million Tree Initiative
- Natural resource management
- Planting strategy
- Silviculture
- Tree care
- Urban forest inequity
- Urban reforestation
