= Midland Reafforesting Association =

UK environmental organization

The Midland Reafforesting Association (MRA) was an early environmental organisation concerned with facilitating the planting of trees (reforestation) on land degraded by previous industrial activity. Such work was motivated by the aims of promoting landscape enhancement, improving the local environment and achieving the restoration of land to more productive land uses.

Based in the Black Country, the Association were formally established at a public meeting in the city of Birmingham on 12 February 1903. The first President of the Association was Sir Oliver Lodge—a distinguished scientist of the day and pioneer of wireless telegraphy. Other notable supporters included the future Prime Minister Stanley Baldwin, the Earl of Dudley and Henry Norman. By being registered as a Friendly Society, the Association was able to own its own land. It also planted on private and council owned land—often using trees raised from seed in the Association's own nurseries.

Achieving some significant successes in promoting tree planting, arranging Arbor Days and furthering the scientific understanding of restoring degraded land, the MRA was ultimately largely unsuccessful in delivering large scale afforestation in the Black Country and was wound up in 1925. Their legacy however remains—not least in their largest plantation, in Walsall, at the since-demolished Moxley Hospital, Moorcroft Wood, which was named a local nature reserve, in 1996, and also in the form of the Black Country Urban Forest, a Millennium Project which greatly increased tree cover in the Black Country between 1995 and 2005.

== Species selection ==
In their experimental work, the MRA found the tree species that were best suited to the inhospitable conditions and climate of pit mounds were:

- Alnus glutinosa – common alder
- Alnus incana – grey alder
- Populus x euramericana 'serotina' – hybrid black poplar
- Salix spp – willows
- Betula pendula – silver birch
- Fraxinus excelsior – ash
- Acer pseudoplatanus – sycamore

== See also ==
- Afforestation
- National Urban Forestry Unit
- Wildlife Trust for Birmingham and the Black Country
