= National Urban Forestry Unit =

Defunct British charity

The National Urban Forestry Unit (NUFU) was a British charity established in 1995 to promote urban forestry. Urban forestry is the care and management of single trees and tree populations in urban settings for the purpose of improving the urban environment. Urban forestry involves both planning and management, including the programming of care and maintenance operations of the urban forest.

The National Urban Forestry Unit was a charitable organisation which worked to raise awareness of the positive contribution that trees make to the quality of life in towns. It championed urban and community forestry to those tackling such issues as public health, leisure and recreation, land reclamation, built development, heritage and education. It was wound up in 2005.

The National Urban Forestry Unit's aims were: To increase awareness, understanding and popular support for trees in towns; to encourage a strategic approach to the development of urban forestry; to promote technical excellence, research, innovation and best value in all aspects of urban forestry; to provide a national focus for the exchange of information and good practice in urban forestry; and to champion the work of the growing number of UK urban and community forestry projects.

NUFU evolved from the smaller Black Country Urban Forestry Unit into a national charity. Its established the Black Country Urban Forest, a programme of urban forestry supported by the Millennium Commission, which achieved 362 hectares of new woodland planting across the Black Country.

NUFU also produced a series of case studies of best practice in urban forestry, now preserved in an online archive by the Wildlife Trust for Birmingham and the Black Country.
