= Black Country Urban Forest =

English forestry project

Coordinates: 52.53°N 2.08°W

The Black Country Urban Forest (BCUF) is a project to make urban forestry the characteristic landscape of one of England's industrial areas, The Black Country.

== Origins ==
The BCUF resulted from the “Millennium Forest”, the most ambitious urban forestry project ever undertaken in the UK – a huge program of urban tree planting and management of urban woodlands, creating a tremendous increase in the area of woodland in the area.

The Black Country (the part of the West Midlands conurbation consisting of the city of Wolverhampton and the Metropolitan Boroughs of Dudley, Sandwell, and Walsall) was the 'forge' of the Industrial Revolution, and the legacy of this was huge areas of derelict land. Even at the turn of the 19th and 20th centuries the Midland reafforesting association was creating new woodlands on former colliery tips and other suitable sites across the area. At the end of the 20th Century ambitious targets were set and huge increases in planting proposed.

== Development ==
The project, “Treeways”, focused on transport corridors in the area, and acted as a pilot. The four voluntary sector principals in this project – National Urban Forestry Unit (NUFU), Wildlife Trust for Birmingham and the Black Country, British Trust for Conservation Volunteers (BTCV) and Groundwork Black Country. They went on to work closely with the four local authorities to propose the ambitious Millennium programme. Despite setbacks, and problems with achieving all the projected outputs, the project was essentially successful, and the concept of the BCUF continues.

As well as tree planting and woodland management, woodland based businesses were supported, events and activities organised to engage local communities and studies of the area's biodiversity were carried out.

The Millennium Forest project was funded by the UK's Millennium Fund, matched by regeneration funding from the UK government and Europe, grants from the Forestry Commission and many other sources. The total cost was over £7 million.

Responsibility for the Black Country Urban Forest is now shared between Groundwork Black Country and the landowners, each of whom entered into a 99-year deed of dedication, a legal agreement with the Millennium Commission.
