= Compartmentalization of decay in trees =

Plant defense mechanism against wood-decay pathogens

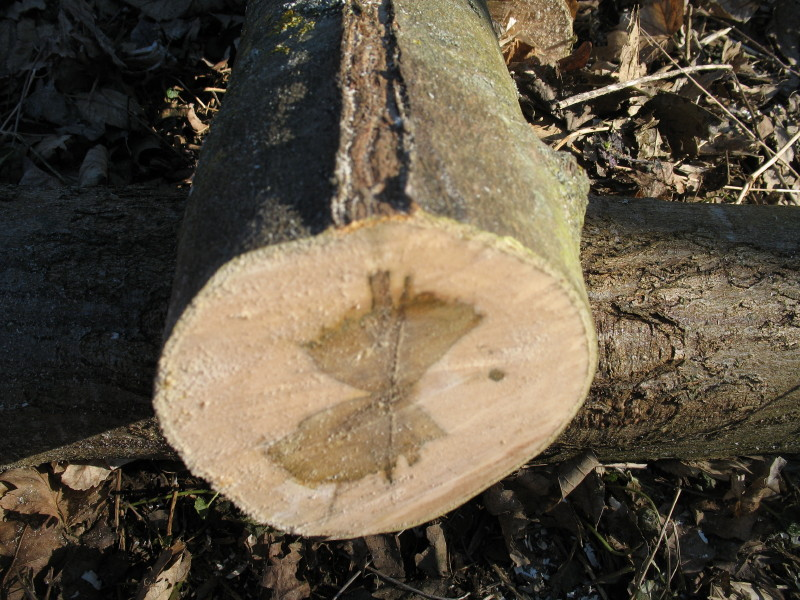
Example of compartmentalization, with radial and circular walling, in an Acer platanoides of 5 years

Compartmentalization of decay in trees (CODIT) is a model developed by plant pathologist Alex Shigo to describe how after a tree is wounded, the resulting defects are compartmentalized.

== Theoretical background ==
In keeping with the theory of spontaneous generation, in which living things can develop from non-living things, scientists traditionally believed that tree decay led to fungal growth. With the advent of germ theory, however, German forester Robert Hartig in the early 20th century theorized the opposite was the case, and developed a new model for tree decay: when trees are wounded, fungi infect the wounds, and the result is decayed wood.

Shigo expanded this theory to claim that when trees are wounded, they respond to the infected wood with both chemical and physical changes to limit the decay, which he called compartmentalization.

== Process ==
CODIT model walls labeled

According to CODIT, when a tree is wounded cells undergo changes to form "walls" around the wound, slowing or preventing the spread of disease and decay to the rest of the tree.

- Wall 1. The first wall is formed by plugging up normally conductive vascular tissue above and below the wound. This tissue runs up and down the length of the stem, so plugging it slows the vertical spread of decay. Tissues are plugged in various ways, such as with tylosis, polyphenolic deposits, anti-fungal substances and (in conifers) by the closure of the bordered pits linking vessel cells. This wall is the weakest.
- Wall 2. The second wall is formed by the thick-walled, lignin-rich cells of the latewood growth ring interior and exterior to the wound, thus slowing the radial spread of decay. This wall is the second weakest, and is continuous except where intersected by ray cells (see next section).
- Wall 3. The third wall is formed by ray cells, which are groups of radiating cells oriented perpendicularly to the stem axis, dividing the stem into segments not entirely unlike the slices of a pie. These groups of cells are not continuous and vary in length, height and thickness, forming a maze-like barrier to tangential spread of decay. After wounding, some ray cells are also altered chemically, becoming toxic to some microorganisms. This is the strongest wall at the time of wounding, prior to the growth of the fourth wall.
- Wall 4. The fourth wall, known as the barrier zone, is created by new growth of specialised woody tissue on the exterior of the tree, isolating tissue present at the time of infection from subsequent growth. This is the strongest wall, and often the only one which can completely halt the spread of infection by closing the wound with new wood. When only the fourth wall remains intact, the result is something most people have seen walking through the woods or in a park: a living tree with a completely rotted-out interior. In such cases, all the tissue present at the time of injury has become infected, but new healthy tissue has been allowed to continue to grow outside of the fourth wall.

== Practical impact ==
By increasing understanding of how trees respond to decay, CODIT has had many applications. For example, arborists are frequently called upon to analyze the danger posed to people or property by a damaged or decaying tree. By knowing how decay is likely to spread, such hazard tree analyses may be more accurate, thereby preventing unnecessary tree removal, property damage, or injury.

Work done by Dr. Edward F. Gilman at the University of Florida shows that a wound's proximity to leaf mass greatly influences compartmentalization as well as wound closure.
