= Tree health =

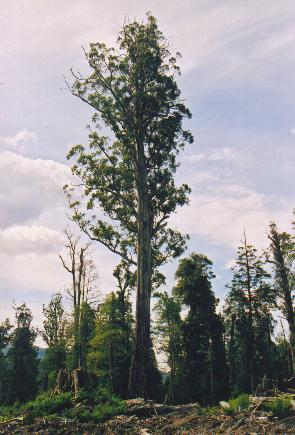
El Grande, about 85 m (279 ft) high, the most massive (though not the tallest) Eucalyptus regnans was accidentally killed by loggers burning-off the remains of legally loggable trees (less than 85 m) that had been felled all around it

Trees can live for a long time but eventually die, either from natural causes or by being cut down by man. Ill-health of trees can be diagnosed, and early treatment, pruning or felling to prevent the spread may result in timber stocks and amenity trees being saved. Tree owners and Arborists/arboriculturists need to be aware of the risk posed by hazardous trees. Construction projects sometimes avoidably damage trees.

== Sources of tree damage ==
The causes of tree damage and abnormalities can conveniently be divided into either biotic (from living sources) or abiotic (from non-living sources).

Biotic sources include insects (e.g. that bore into the tree), mammals (e.g. deer that rub bark off), fungi, birds, nematodes, bacteria and viroids.

Abiotic sources include lightning, vehicles impacts, construction activities, drought, waterlogging, frost, winds, chemicals in the soil and air and soil nutrient deficiencies. Construction activities can involve any of a number of damage types, including grade changes or compaction that prevent aeration to roots, spills involving toxic chemicals such as cement or petroleum products, or severing of branches or roots. Trees with thinner bark such as birch and American sycamore are more sensitive to such damage.

One of the most common naturally occurring hazards in large trees is weakness in the union between trunk and branch (or between co-dominant substems). V-shaped unions may create weakness and increase failure risk; in some situations this can be reduced by tree cabling, which limits how far the union can flex in strong winds or other loads..

Any of these damage sources and the natural ageing of trees may result in trees or parts of them failing prematurely. The term "hazard trees" is commonly used by arborists/arboriculturists, and industry groups such as power line operators, for trees that, due to disease or other factors, are more susceptible to falling in windstorms, or having parts of the tree fall. Damage may also disfigure amenity trees, create unacceptable risks to people, reduce the safe useful life of trees or reduce the value of commercial timber.

Trees can withstand large amounts of some types of damage and survive, but even small amounts of other traumas can result in death, disfiguration or hazards. Established trees will normally not tolerate any appreciable disturbance of the root system. Without arboricultural advice, lay people and construction professionals may not be aware how easily or indirectly a tree can be killed.

=== Decay studies ===
Fallen logs of white spruce and trembling aspen at various stages of decomposition were sampled from undisturbed and 1, 14, and 28-year-old post-fire and post-harvest sites in northern Alberta, and studied for differences in the associated microfungus communities (Lumley et al. 2001). Wood samples were plated directly onto each of 6 different media and from these fungal species were identified and enumerated over a 24-month period. Approximately 10 000 isolates were obtained, representing 292 species of filamentous microfungi, including 41 ascomycetes, 29 zygomycetes, and 222 mitosporic fungi. The most commonly isolated species were Trichoderma viride, Rhinocladiella atrovirens, Penicillium pinophilum and Mortierella ramanniana. Cluster analysis and ordination of microfungus communities in logs showed that the tree species of the log had the greatest influence on the species composition of communities. Fungus community composition was also correlated with the stage of decomposition. Species richness was highest in logs from undisturbed sites, and lowest in logs from the most recently disturbed sites. Species diversity (Shannon-Weaver) was only slightly higher at undisturbed sites than at disturbed sites. The most significant environmental factor was log moisture, which increased proportionately with stage of decomposition and was significantly correlated with climatic factors.

Wounds inflicted on residual trees during partial cutting often provide portals for decay fungi. Affected trees are prone to blowdown and breakage at the wound site, and even if they survive to rotation age their value is reduced by staining and decay in the wood. The influence of temperature on microbial diversity in wounds in white and black spruces was investigated by Dumas and McLaughlin (2003). Samples were taken from trees wounded during manual or feller-buncher partial cutting and skidding operations in the Black Sturgeon Forest, 120 km northeast of Thunder Bay, Ontario. The samples were taken from 76 trees in early October when the mean aerial temperature exceeded 0 °C and 23 trees in late October/early November when the mean aerial temperature was below 0 °C, to serve as the pre-freeze-up and post-freeze-up groups, respectively. The wounds were sampled and cultured. The number and ratio of bacteria, actinomycetes, and fungi on one-week-old wounds varied between pre- and post- freeze-up wounds, wound locations, and media. However, random samples of the different classes of microbes isolated from the 2 spruce species did not differ significantly, indicating no relationship between tree species and microbe. Wounds were more common on stems (94) than on roots (64) or butts (33). Wounds on roots averaged 2 and 3 times the area of those on stems and butts, respectively. More bacteria than fungi were isolated from the pre-freeze-up wounds than from the post-freeze-up wounds, while fungi were more plentiful than bacteria on the post freeze-up wounds.

== Tree risk assessment ==
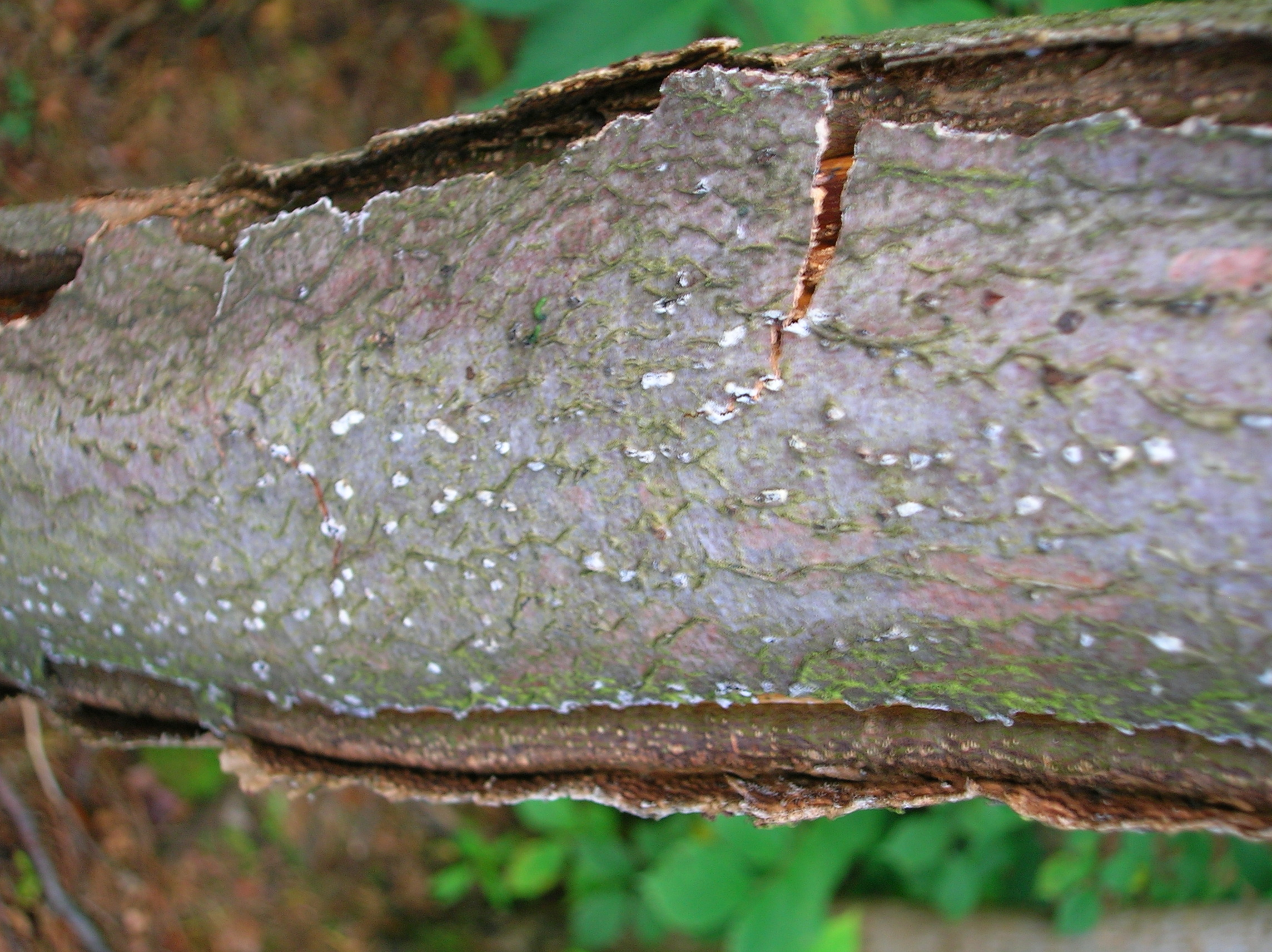
Callus growth on beech branch following fire (heat) damage

Evaluating the danger a tree presents, whether by its state of health or by its situation, to people and/or property is called Tree Risk Assessment. Techniques have emerged based on Matheny & Clark's matrix of three factors which contribute to the degree of risk namely (i) failure potential (ii) size of defective part and (iii) target rating (how often something or someone is present to be harmed or damaged). Subsequently, a Quantified Tree Risk Assessment ("QTRA") system has been developed by others that calculates the risk numerically with reference to cost implications of tree damage and published societal norms of acceptable, tolerable and unacceptable risk. The International Society of Arboriculture updated its approach in 2012 with a qualitative (words based) matrix known as Qualitative Tree Risk Assessment ("TRAQ")

To comply with the tree owner's legal duty of care to occupiers, visitors, passers-by or neighbours, where regular observation or monitoring of the tree's condition is not possible, tree inspections should be carried out at appropriate intervals by a competent person and their risk reduction recommendations should be implemented.

== Maintaining Tree Health ==
=== Plant Health Care ===
Plant Health Care (PHC) is multi-dimensional management strategy for tree and plant care to preserve the vitality of the urban and community forest. Arborists and Plant Health Care Specialists apply a broad range of techniques by selecting and integrating treatment options that protect and enhance the health, structure, and appearance of plants in the landscape.

"PHC attempts to prevent problems before they start." It is a holistic approach to plant management that focuses on a plant's interaction between living and nonliving components of the landscape. Typically, PHC is a service business that relies on the relationship between arborist and client to make management decisions based on the health of the tree, the goals of the client, and the professional education and recommendation provided by the arborist.

While PHC evolved from Integrated Pest Management (IPM), the goals and emphasis of each system vary. PHC focuses on managing the specific, individualized needs of a plant and its surrounding growing environment. PHC involves identifying what stressors are impacting a plant or tree's health to create a care profile that reflects the clients goals to maintain healthy plants and trees within an environmental context.

==== Principles of Plant Health Care ====
- Monitoring
- Developing thresholds (economic, aesthetic, psychological, biological, and ecological)
- Identifying key stressors
- Cultural manipulation and plant resistance
- Use of multiple management options
- Customer service
- Key Plant Concepts
- Key Stress Concepts

==== Health Management Treatment Options ====
- Cultural Control: plant selection, cultural practices promoting soil health, balancing soil pH, pruning, sanitation
- Biological Control: suppression a pest population using predators, parasites, and pathogens, augmentation of beneficial organisms to supplement existing populations
- Chemical Control: Fungicides, insecticides, miticides, bactericides, repellents, herbicides, contact or systemic pesticides
- Alternative Pesticides: biorational control products, insecticidal soap, horticultural oils, botanicals, insect growth regulators, microbial-based products, and microbial agents
- Mechanical Management: physical removal of pests from a plant (e.g., picking off bagworms from an evergreen bush), installing physical barriers to bar pests, pruning out infested parts of the plant

== Construction and tree protection ==
Assessment of the damaging effect of construction activities on a tree can be based on three factors: severity, extent and duration. Fundamentally activity should avoid the crown of the tree and the volume of rooting required by the tree for ongoing vitality. Severity is related to the degree of intrusion into the rooting area and resultant root loss. Extent is related to a percentage of a factor such as canopy, roots or bark, and duration is based on the length of time that the activity interferes with the tree's normal functions.

Various organizations, such as the International Society of Arboriculture, the British Standards Institute and the Tree Industry Association (formerly the National Arborist Association), have long recognized the sensitivity of tree health to construction activities. The effects are important because they can result in monetary and/or amenity value losses due to tree damage and resultant remediation or replacement costs, and/or prosecution for violation of government ordinances (in the UK, planning laws, regulations and policies) or community- or subdivision restrictions.

In the US, protocols for tree management prior to, during and after construction activities are well established, tested and refined. These basic steps are involved:

- Review of the construction plans
- Development of the related tree inventory
- Application of standard construction tree management protocols
- Assessment of potential for tree damage
- Development of a tree protection plan (providing for pre-, concurrent, and post construction damage prevention and remediation steps)
- Development of a remediation plan
- Implementation of tree protection zones (TPZ)
- Assessment of construction tree damage, post-construction
- Implementation of the remediation plan

In the UK, a similar protocol exists.

== See also ==
- Arboriculture
- Horticulture
- International Society of Arboriculture
- Plant health
- Tree Care
