= Forest Ecosystems =

- Discipline: Forestry
- Language: English
- Edited by: Weilun Yin; Klaus von Gadow

Publication details
- History: 2014–present
- Publisher: KeAi Communications Co. Ltd. (China)
- Frequency: Bimonthly
- Open access: Yes
- License: Creative Commons Attribution License
- Impact factor: 5.4 (2025)

Standard abbreviations
- ISO 4: For. Ecosyst.

Indexing
- ISSN: 2095-6355 (print); 2197-5620 (web)

Links
- Journal homepage; Online Access

Forest Ecosystems is a bimonthly peer-reviewed open access scientific journal covering research related to the structure and dynamics of "natural" and "domesticated" forest ecosystems. Previously published by Springer Nature, as of 2022 it is published by Elsevier on behalf of KeAi Communications.

== History ==
The journal was established in 2014 by Weilun Yin (尹伟伦 (Beijing Forestry University) and Klaus von Gadow (University of Göttingen). The journal is sponsored by the Beijing Forestry University.

== Academic conferences ==
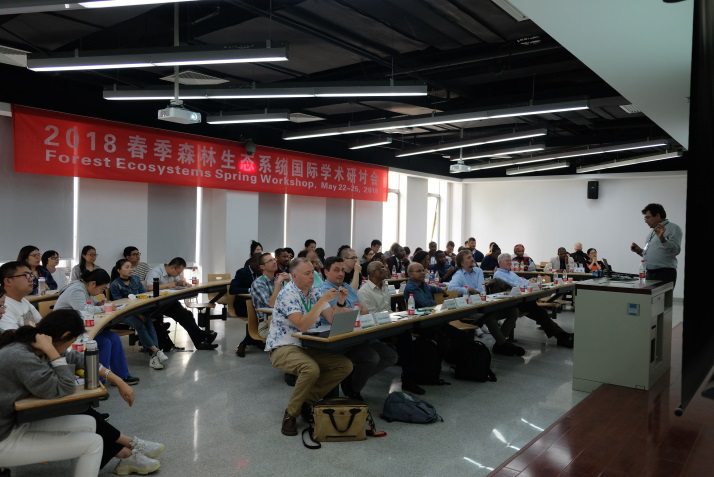
Picture taken in Beijing during the "Forest Ecosystems Spring Workshop 2018"

The journal sponsors two international conferences each year in Beijing under the sponsorship of Beijing Forestry University.

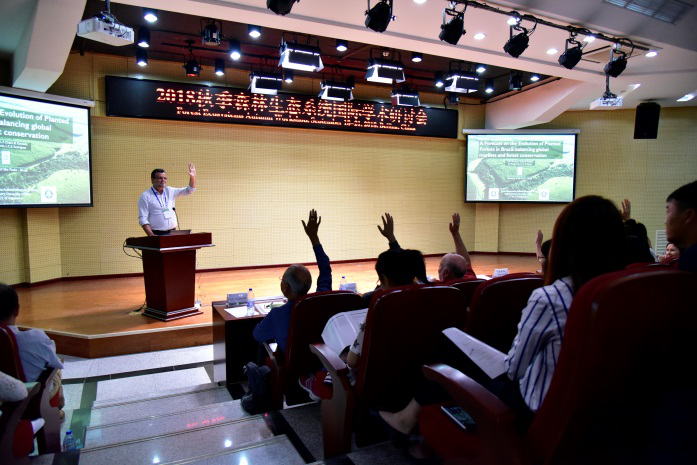
Picture taken in Beijing during the "Forest Ecosystems Autumn Workshop 2018"

== Editors-in-chief ==
The editors-in-chief are John A. Kershaw (University of New Brunswick) and Osbert Jianxin Sun (孙建新; Beijing Forestry University).

== Abstracting and indexing ==
The journal is abstracted and indexed in:

- BIOSIS Previews
- Biological Abstracts
- Current Contents/Agriculture, Biology & Environmental Sciences
- Science Citation Index Expanded
- Scopus
- The Zoological Record
- Directory of Open Access Journals (DOAJ)

According to the Journal Citation Reports, the journal has a 2025 impact factor of 5.4.

== Notable articles ==
- Calkin, David; Thompson, Matthew; Finney, Mark (2015-04-14). "Negative consequences of positive feedbacks in US wildfire management". Forest Ecosystems. 2 (9). doi:10.1186/s40663-015-0033-8. S2CID 256431201 – via Springer Open.
- Paul, Thomas; Kimberley, Mark; Beets, Peter (2021). "Natural forests in New Zealand – a large terrestrial carbon pool in a national state of equilibrium". Forest Ecosystems. 8 (34) (published 2021-06-02). doi:10.1186/s40663-021-00312-0. S2CID 256428120 – via Springer Open.

== Most cited articles ==
According to its official website, the most cited articles are:

- Messier, Christian; Bauhus, Jürgen; Doyon, Frederik; et al. (2019-12-01). "The functional complex network approach to foster forest resilience to global changes". Forest Ecosystems. 6 (1). doi:10.1186/s40663-019-0166-2. hdl:1807/94409. S2CID 256432350.
- Sheil, Douglas (2018-12-01). "Forests, atmospheric water and an uncertain future: the new biology of the global water cycle". Forest Ecosystems. 5 (1). doi:10.1186/s40663-018-0138-y. S2CID 256427766.
- Kuuluvainen, Timo; Gauthier, Sylvie (2018-12-01). "Young and old forest in the boreal: critical stages of ecosystem dynamics and management under global change". Foest Ecosystems. 5 (1). doi:10.1186/s40663-018-0142-2. hdl:10138/239253. S2CID 256429053.

== See also ==
- Agricultural and Forest Meteorology
- Urban Forestry and Urban Greening
- Forest Ecology and Management
