= Konijnendijk =

Konijnendijk (pronounced [koːˈnɛinə(n)dɛik]) is a Dutch surname derived from konijn 'rabbit' and dijk 'dike, embankment', ultimately denoting a place of origin. The surname may refer to:

- Roel Konijnendijk, Dutch historian
- Cecil Konijnendijk (born 1970), Dutch researcher and educator in urban forestry and greening
