= European City of the Trees =

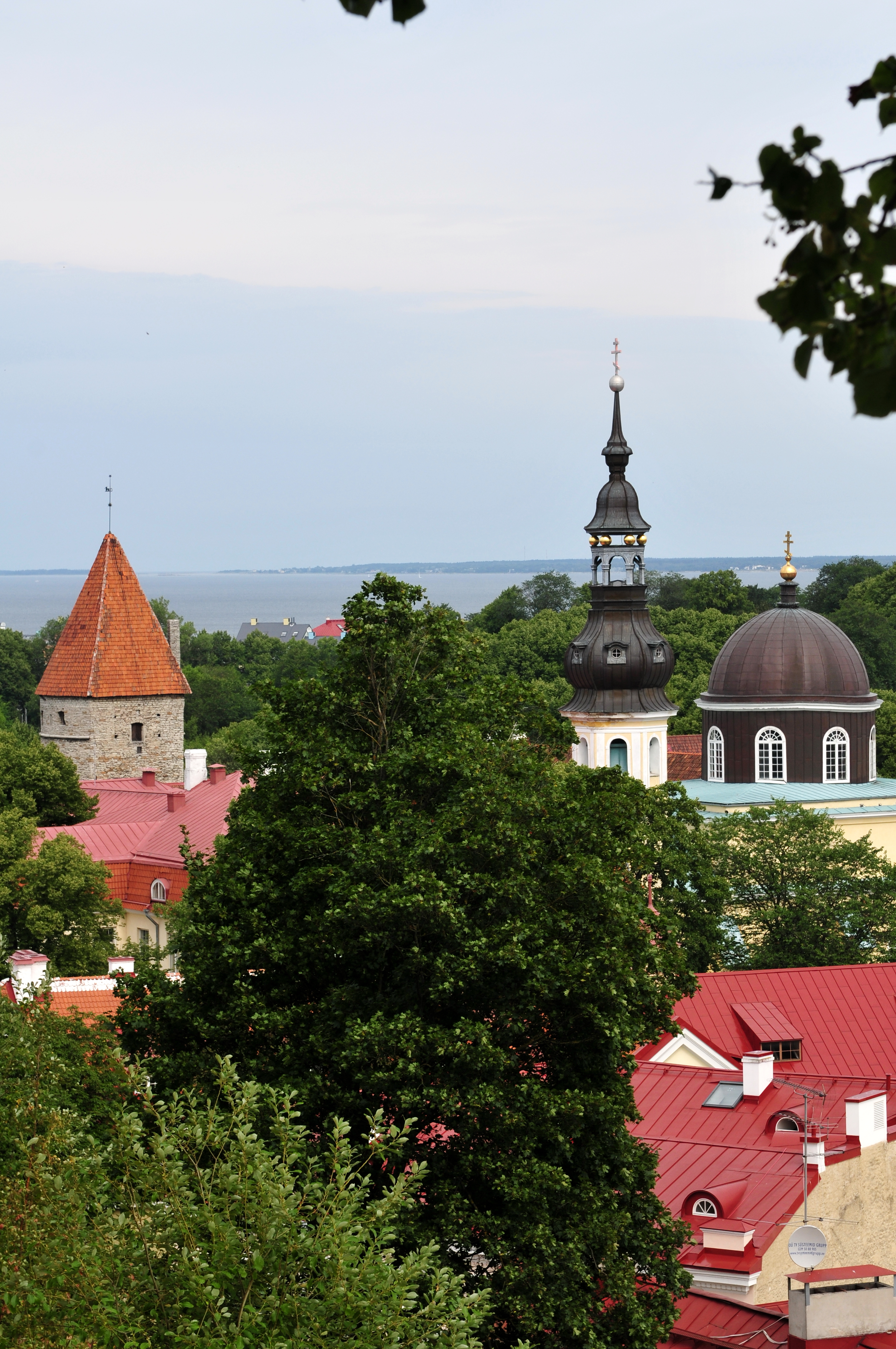
Tallinn was the European City of the Trees in 2015

European City of the Trees (ECOT) is the title and award given by the European Arboricultural Council (EAC). The award is given annually to a town or city in recognition of efforts to care for trees in its urban area.

Awards are determined by a jury of arboricultural experts.

== Criteria for assessment ==
The criteria for determining a city's urban tree efforts are described as follows:

1. The city must have at least one tree-related project lasting for a minimum of three years.
2. The project must be a "role model" for the country and region.
3. The project demonstrates significant benefits to the local community.
4. The project contributes to the dissemination of knowledge.
5. The project furthers aims relevant to the European Arboricultural Council objectives.

Additional criteria for the cooperation of nominees with the EAC as well as existing award holders are also described.

== European Cities of the Trees ==
The Netherlands is the only nation to have won the award more than once.

Date of award	City	Country	Reason for award
21 June 2024	Varaždin	Croatia	Varaždin implemented a strategic approach to tree care with support and expertise from local utility company, Parkovi.
30 June 2023	Antwerp	Belgium	Antwerp created artificial root spaces for trees as well as preserving older trees. The root spaces can access water from infiltration trenches, allowing the trees to live up to 120 years.
28 June 2022	Merano	Italy	Merano communicates tree felling and replacement measures to citizens while also publishing a tree cadastre online. Merano introduced a tree protection statute in 2001, a five-year risk management plan for tree population in 2017, and offers cultural events and festivals on the subject of trees.
22 October 2021	Vienna	Austria	Vienna conducted extensive research into urban ecosystem adaptability in changing climatic conditions. Urban trees were planted with municipal nurseries, centralized tree management, protection laws, and dedicated root spaces. A Viennese tree substrate was developed to improve water storage and ventilation. Tree populations were documented in a tree cadastre.
2020	No award given		
7 June 2019	Moscow	Russia	Moscow launched an urban planning programme in 2012 to renovate road sections, particularly busy access roads in central Moscow, with large trees from Germany. In 2012, Zaryadye Park was built with over 700 trees planted by 2018.
8 June 2018	Apeldoorn	Netherlands	Apeldoorn's 2016 municipal tree plan requires street substructures for root spaces, instead of artificial substrates. This allowed healthy tree development in inner-city Apeldoorn.
19 May 2017	Trnava	Slovakia	Trnava made long-standing efforts to expand green areas throughout the city. In 2015 and 2016, Trnava planted more trees than in the previous ten years. Several community tree planting activities were carried out with high-quality saplings.
3 June 2016	Winterthur	Switzerland	Since 2012, Winterthur systematically detected and controlled Asian Longhorned Beetle invasions. Infested trees were cleared twice a year, sniffer dogs were deployed and a citizen telephone service was set up to report cases.
27 May 2015	Tallinn	Estonia	Tallinn had requirements to plant new trees to replace any that had been felled. If trees could not be preserved (for example, on a construction site), new trees would have to be planted in the vicinity, or in a public space. Planning requirements included obligations to compile tree inventory, and assess value classes of trees.
June 2014	Frankfurt	Germany	
21 June 2013	Kraków	Poland	Kraków had more than 40 urban parks covering more than 400 hectares. The Nova Huta district suffered from extreme air pollution, but significant tree planting efforts were underway.
11 May 2012	Amsterdam	Netherlands	Amsterdam had been planting trees on almost every street since the 16th century, with an active tree-planting policy still in place. It is one of the most densely wooded cities of Europe with the highest number of Elm trees. In 2011, an Elm arboretum was opened with globally unique collection. Citizens were highly involved in green policy.
May 2011	Turku	Finland	Following the 1827 Turku Great Fire, the city was reconstructed with trees and parks as a priority, with park areas around the Aura River being developed. Boundary trees were planted between buildings and trees on private properties were protected by law. More than 8,000 trees had been registered in the tree cadastre and in 2009, a public cherry tree planting event took place.
2010	Prague	Czech Republic	Prague had invested heavily in tree populations with a green initiative. Over 500,000 trees had been planted in recent years. The city also hosted the 2010 European Tree Climbing Championship.
15 June 2009	Malmö	Sweden	Malmö introduced a tree registry in 1984 and systematic tree care for the entire city since 1993. Recent urban districts had been planned with tree locations.
16 June 2008	Turin	Italy	
2007	Valencia	Spain	

== See also ==
- European Tree of the Year
