= Tree care =

Arbocultural practices in built environments

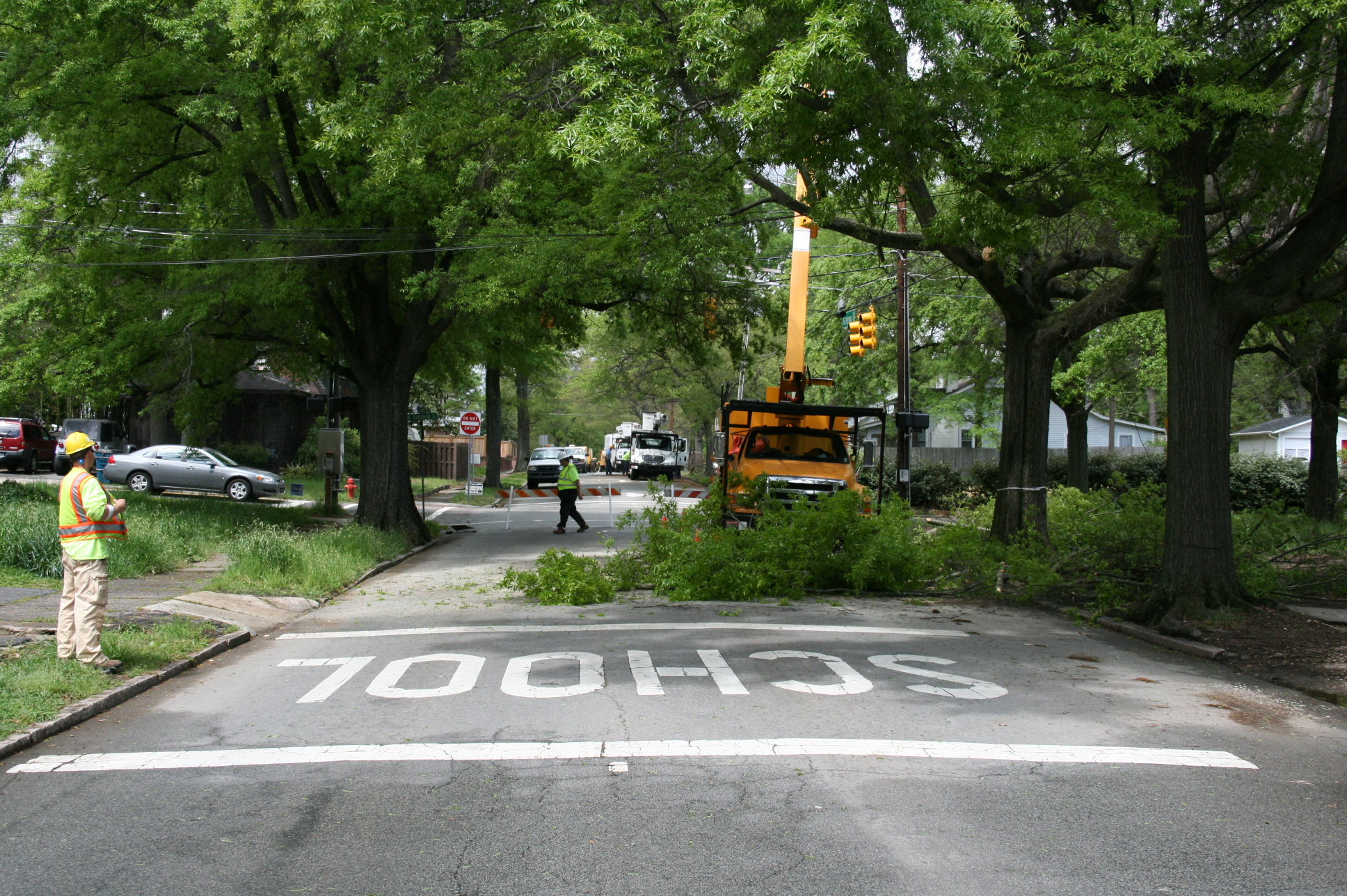
Tree trimming in progress on a street in Durham, North Carolina

Tree care is the application of arboricultural methods like pruning, trimming, and felling/thinning in built environments. Road verge, greenways, backyard and park woody vegetation are at the center of attention for the tree care industry. Landscape architecture and urban forestry also set high demands on professional tree care. High safety standards against the dangers of tree care have helped the industry evolve. Especially felling in space-limited environments poses significant risks: the vicinity of power or telephone lines, insufficient protective gear (against falling dead wood, chainsaw wounds, etc.) and narrow felling zones with endangered nearby buildings, parking cars, etc. The required equipment and experience usually transcends private means and is often considered too costly as a permanent part of the public infrastructure. In singular cases, traditional tools like handsaws may suffice, but large-scale tree care usually calls for heavy machinery like cranes, bucket trucks, harvesters, and woodchippers.

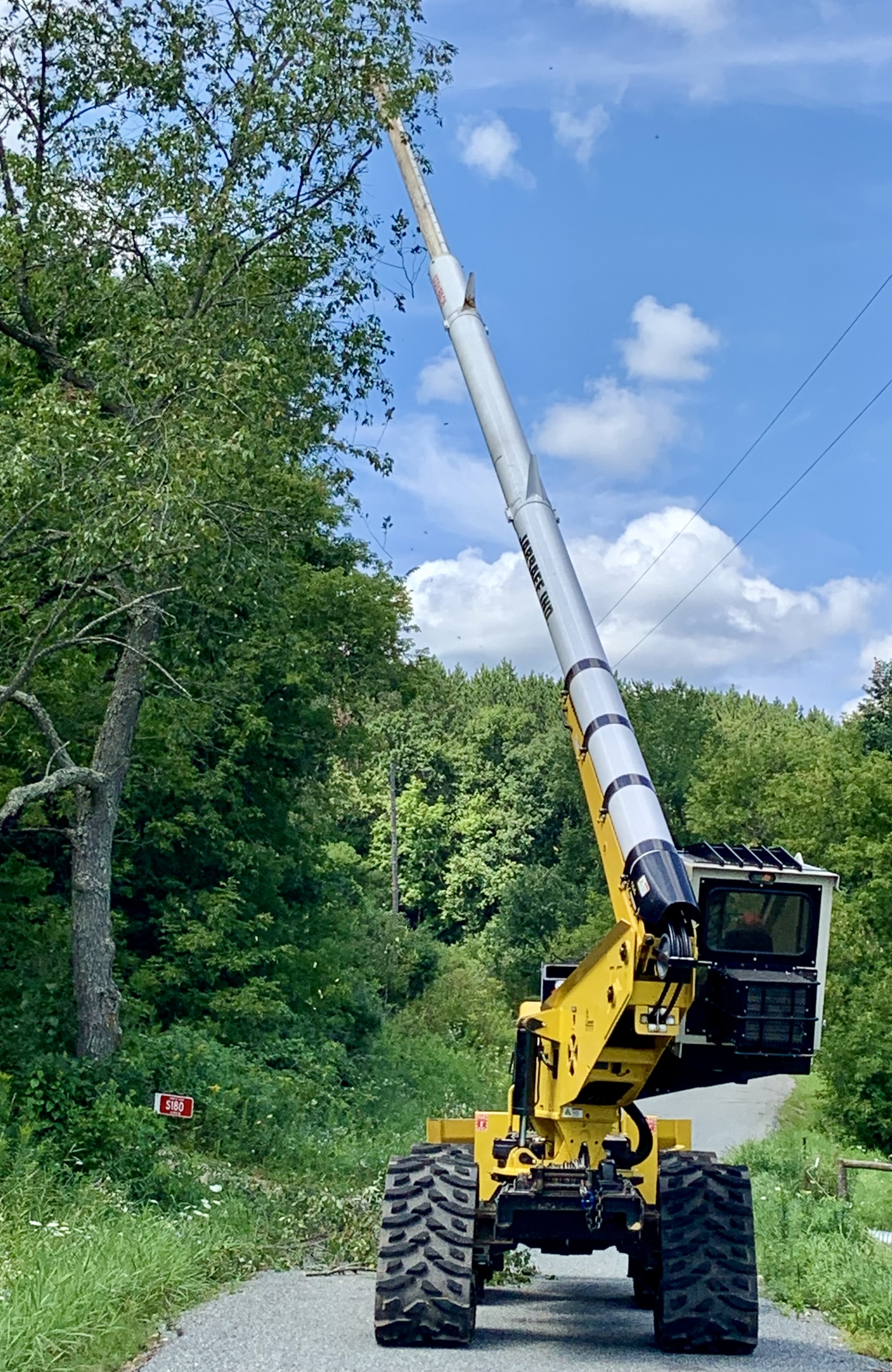
Tree trimmer on tracked treads (Click for video)

Road side trees are especially prone to abiotic stress by exhaust fumes, toxic road debris, soil compaction, and drought which makes them susceptible to fungal infections and various plant pests. When tree removal is not an option, because of road ecology considerations, the main challenge is to achieve road safety (visibility of road signs, blockage-free lanes, etc.) while maintaining tree health.

== Tree removal ==
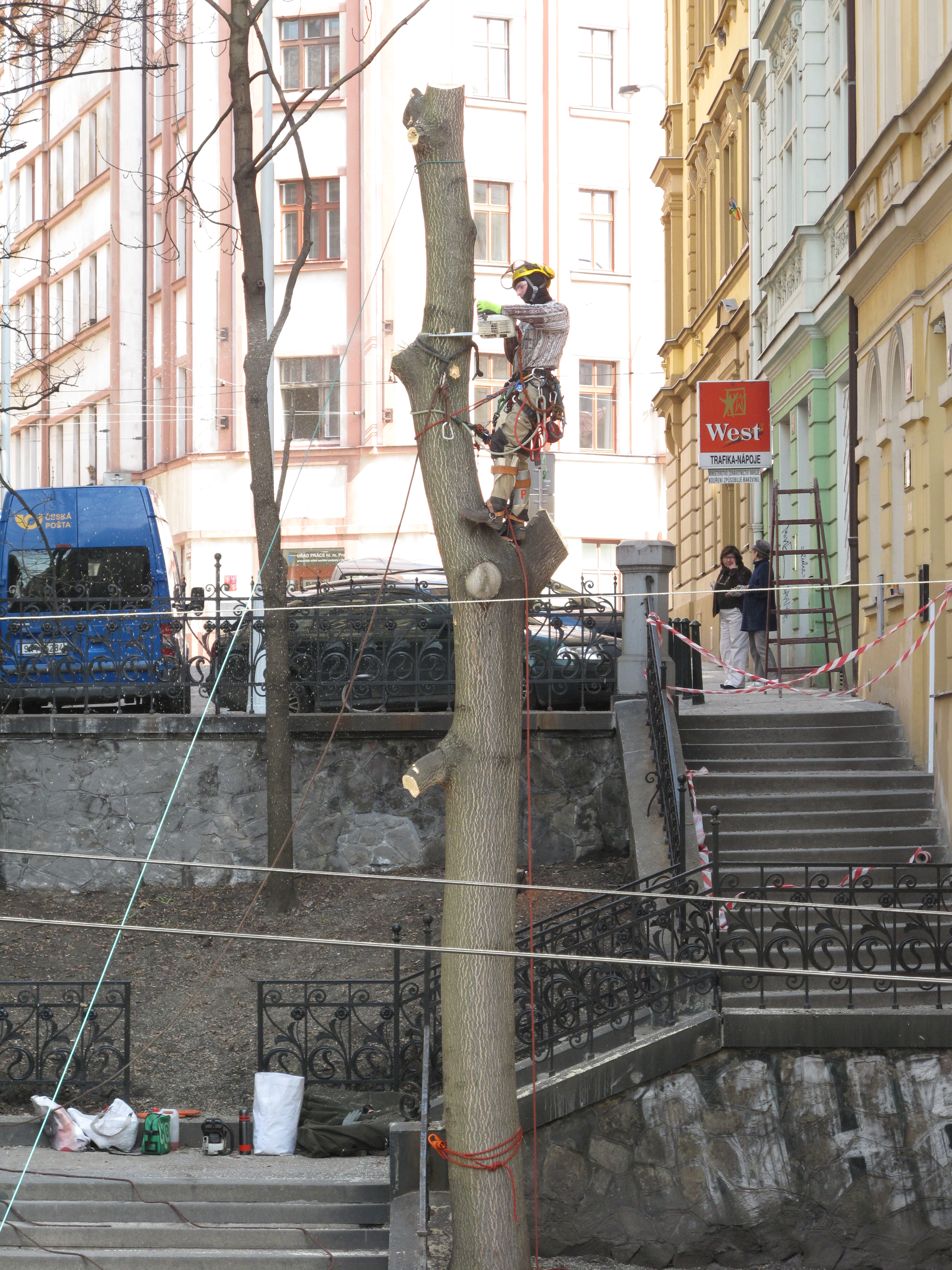
A tree surgeon felling a tree in Prague, Czech Republic

While the perceived risk of death by falling trees (a part of the "tree risk" complex) is influenced by media and often hyped (the objective risk has been reported to be close to 1 : 10.000.000, almost as low as death by lightning), singular events have encouraged a "proactive" stance so that even lightly damaged trees are likely to be removed in urban and public traffic surroundings. As a tree ages and nears the end of its safe useful life expectancy (SULE), its perceived amenity value is decreased greatly. A risk assessment normally carried out by local council's arborist to determine the best course of action. As with all public green spaces, trees in green urban spaces and their careful conservation is sometimes in conflict with aggressive urban development even though it is often understood how urban trees contribute to liveability of suburbs and cities both objectively (reduction of urban heat island effect, etc.) and subjectively. Tree planting programs implemented by a growing number of cities, local councils and organizations is mitigating the losses and in most cases increasing the number of trees in suburbia. Programs include the planting of 2 trees for every 1 tree removed, while some councils are paying land owners to keep trees instead of removing them for farming or construction.

== Standards ==
=== United States ===
# Pruning

1. Soil management
2. Supplemental support systems
3. Lightning protection systems
4. Management
5. Planting and transplanting
6. Integrated vegetation management
7. Root management standard
8. Tree risk assessment
9. Integrated pest management
10. Tree Service

== Professional associations ==
- Tree Care Industry Association
- International Society of Arboriculture
- European Arboricultural Council

== See also ==
- Forest management
- Tree injection
- Tree surgeon
- Tree health
