= Hand felling =

Cutting down trees using hand tools

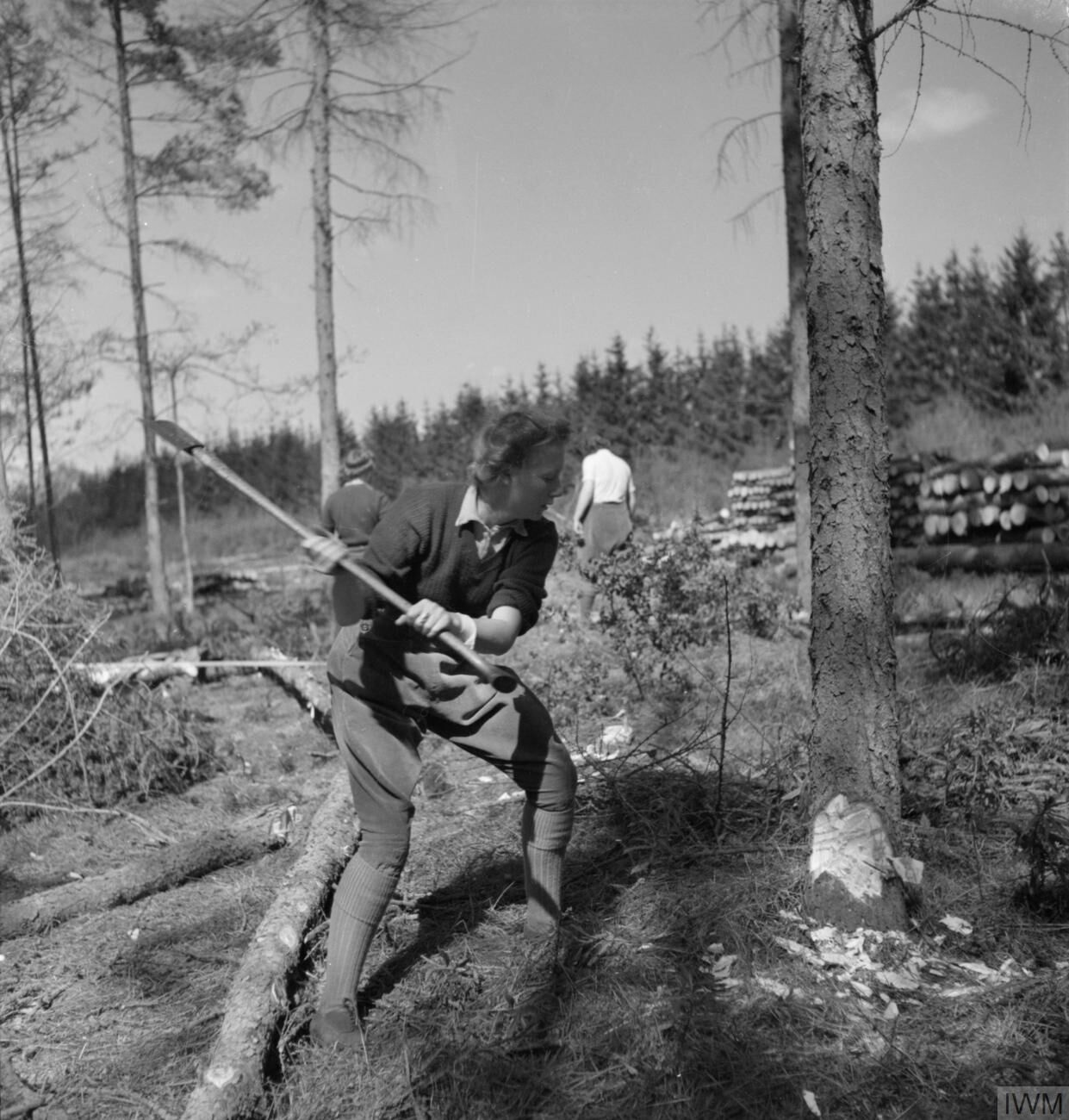
A lumberjack felling a tree with an axe (1943).

Hand felling is the process of cutting down trees using a tool operated with the hands, such as an axe, saw or chainsaw.

== Techniques ==
Most trees that are felled by hand are done so in the same general way. Utilizing proper felling techniques is important not only for operator safety but also for forestry and logging applications related to timber value and potential timber value loss. Maintaining proper posture while felling is also important, i.e., kneeling or squatting instead of stooping or bending over with straight legs. The use of improper felling techniques is dangerous, but may also reduce productivity and log supply, leading to increases in production costs in forestry and logging felling applications.

A good rule of thumb for all felling scenarios is to make the depth of the face cut or undercut, which is your directional angles notch face the way you want the tree to fall, roughly equal to 1/3 the diameter of the tree. Additionally, one should leave about 10% for your holding wood or hinge wood to direct the tree on its way to the ground. The remaining part of the tree's diameter is for the back cut, which weakens the tree structurally enough for it to fall without splintering and other unwanted effects.

There are three types of directional felling notches that are most commonly used in the logging and arboriculture industries by chainsaw operators. They are the conventional, the Humbolt, and the open-face. Each has different advantages and disadvantages based on the type of tree, the condition of the tree, the environment surrounding the tree, and the region in which the tree is being felled.

=== Face-Cuts ===
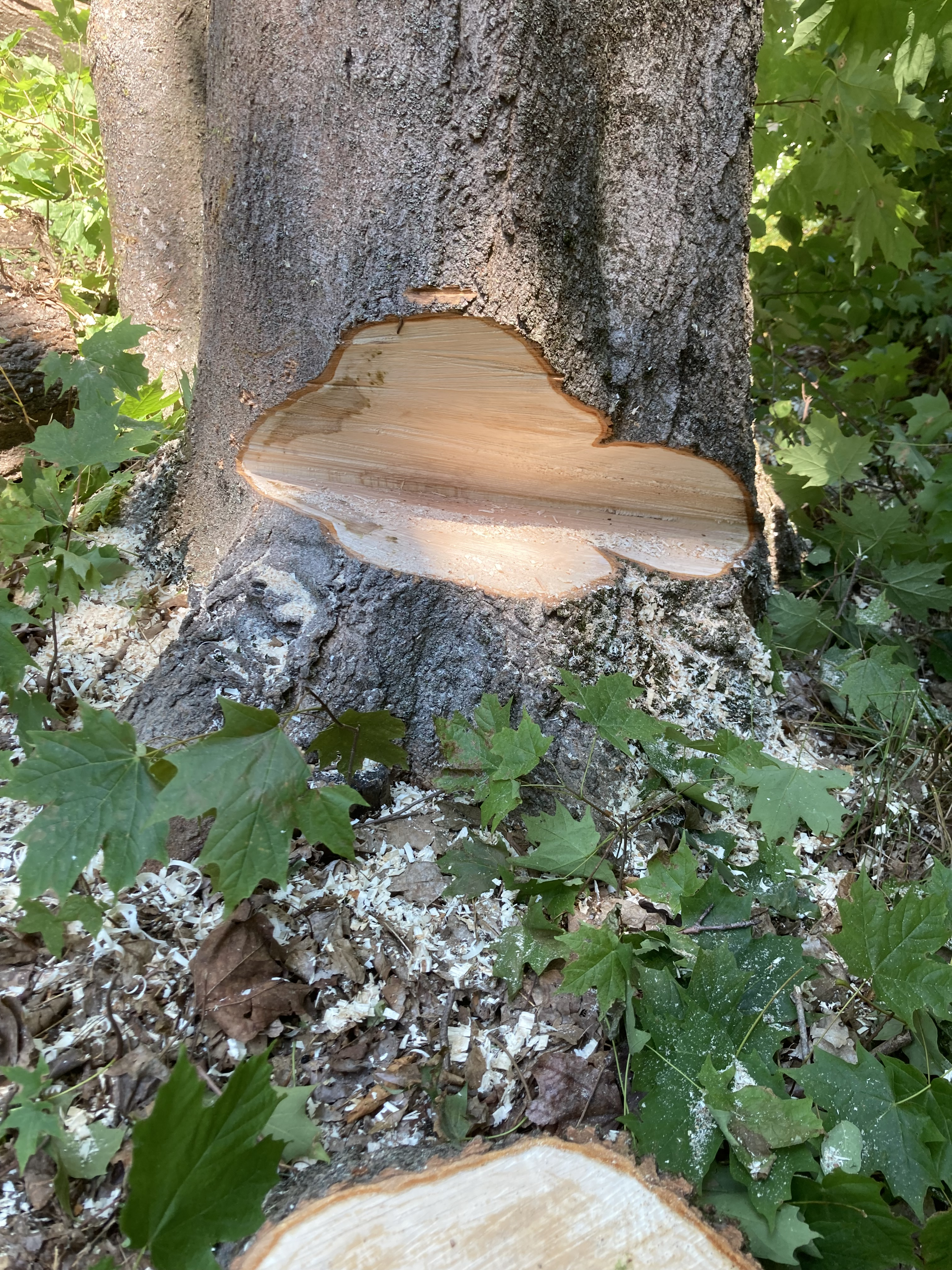
A Conventional face cut in a Norway Maple.

The conventional face cut is perhaps the most commonly used and most well recognized face cut used in the world today. It has an open upwards angle of plus or minus 35 degrees, and is the easiest undercut to learn. Lining up the cuts is fairly easy and quick, and it gives the operator the most directional control of the tree as it falls since the top of the tree will always hit the ground first due to the prolonged time the tree spends on the stump. Some downsides of the conventional face cut are that the two flat faces of the angle can come into contact prior to the tree actually hitting the ground, which can cause stump pull, log fiber pull, or a barber chair effect where the tree splits in half and snaps back in the direction of the operator. All of the above scenarios are extremely dangerous and negatively effect the monetary value quality of the tree in a lumber production scenario.

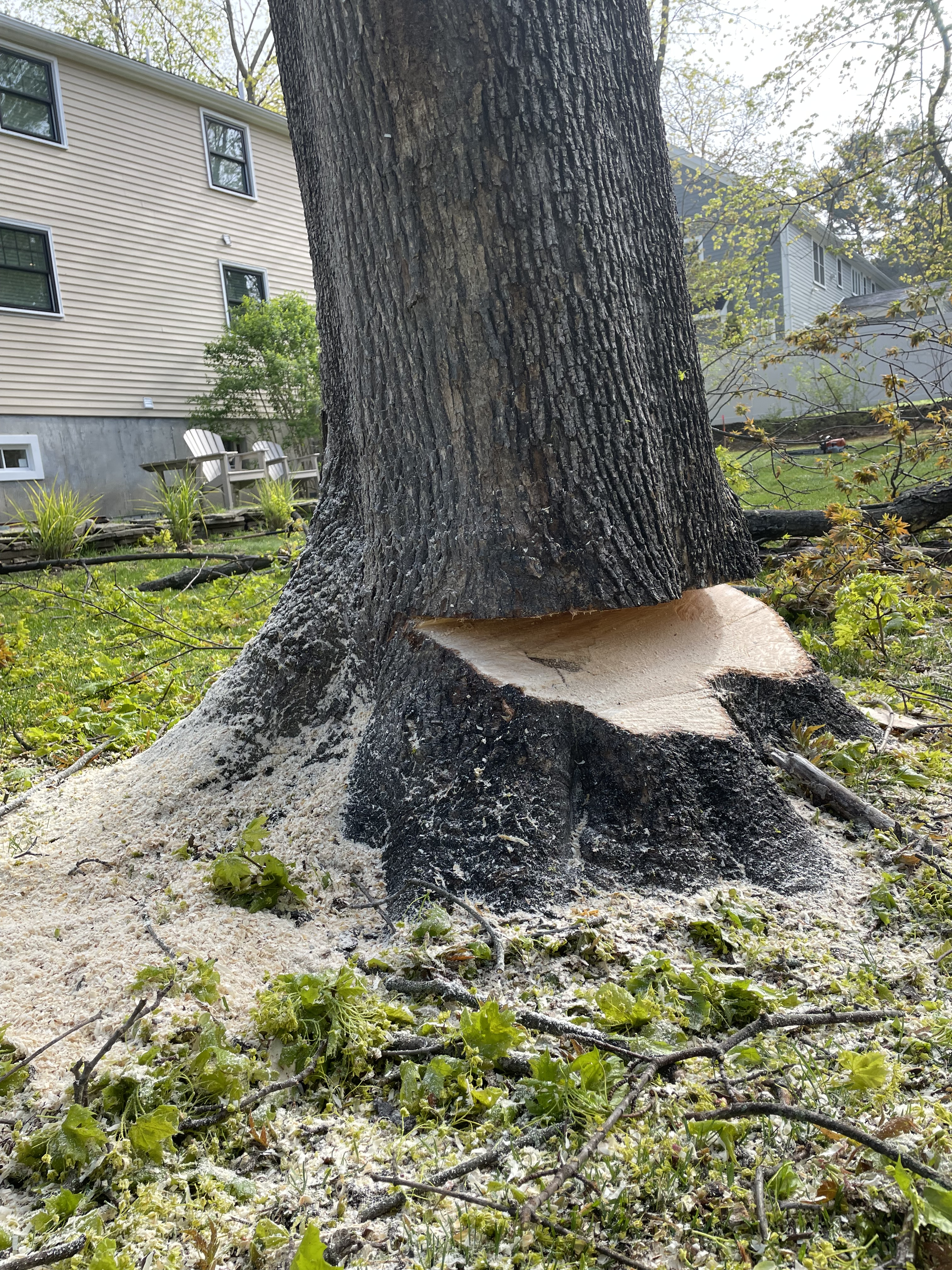
A Humbolt face cut in a Norway maple.

The Humbolt face cut is a less well-known felling undercut, and is commonly used in the pacific northwest and pacific coast of Canada and Alaska. A Humbolt face cut has a downward 45 degree angle, and allows the directional face cut to be made out of the stump rather than the log. Additionally, the downward open angle of the Humbolt allows the tree to jump off of the stump when it falls, making the tree always land butt first and lay out, which is not only safer for the operator but also smashes up less wood in a timber production scenario. Some downsides of the Humbolt are that it takes significantly more skill to quickly and efficiently line up your cuts, and you cannot cut your stumps as low to the ground due to the downward-facing open angle.

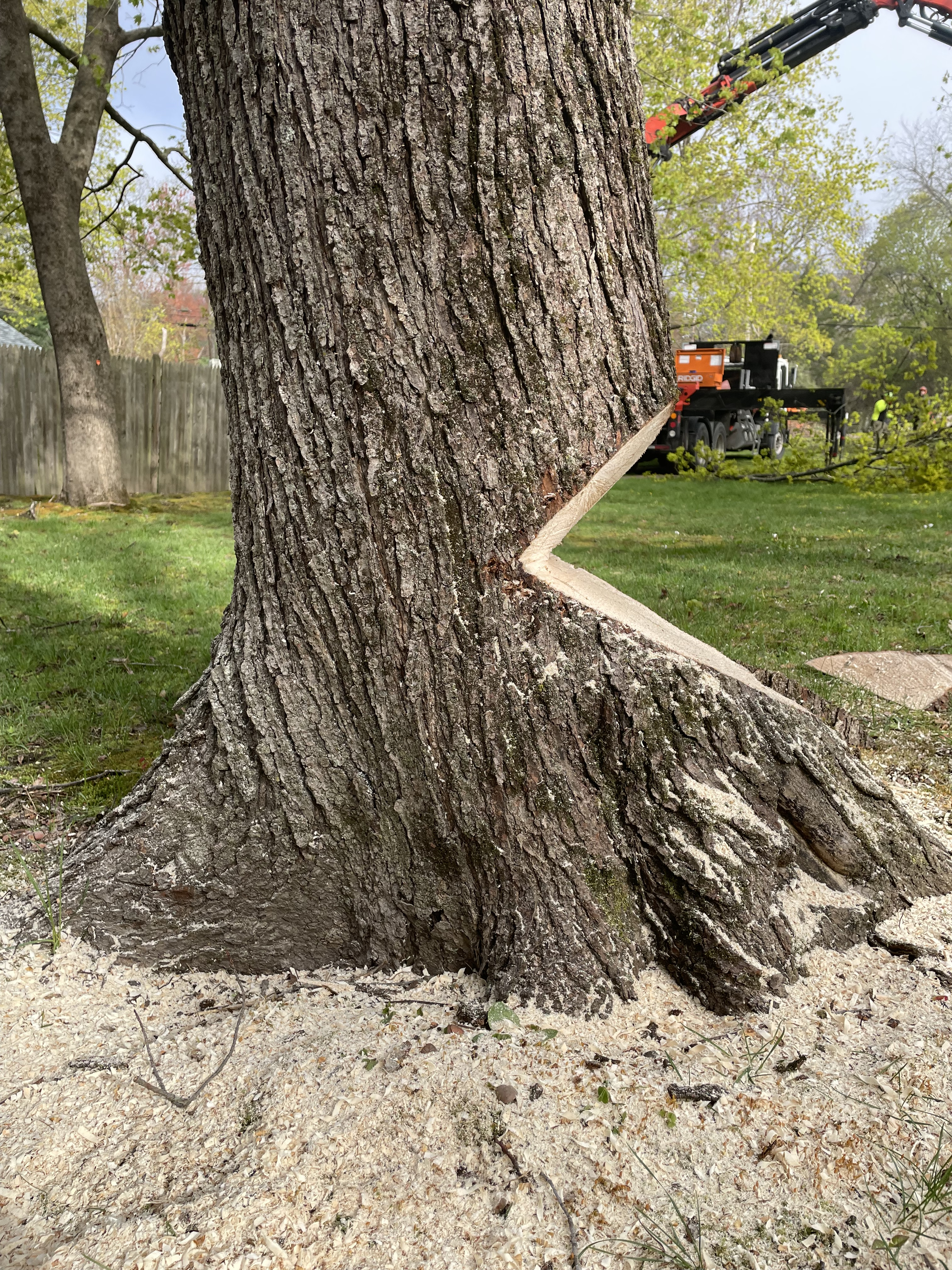
An example of an open-face cut in a back-leaning Red Maple.

The Open-Face undercut is essentially a mixture of the conventional and the Humbolt, with a wide open angle of 70 to 90 degrees. This face cut is most commonly used in extreme scenarios where the tree in question has a severe back lean. The wide open angle of the cut allows the tree time to become upright, and then close as it falls without the two flat ends of the angle prematurely closing. The open face is fairly easy to master and line up correctly. A couple big disadvantages are that it takes quite a bit more time to cut compared to a conventional or Humbolt, and there is waste left on both the stump and the log due to the angle being so open. It is not a common practice in the logging community and is much more frequently used in commercial tree work.
