= Alex Shigo =

American horticulturist (1930-2006)

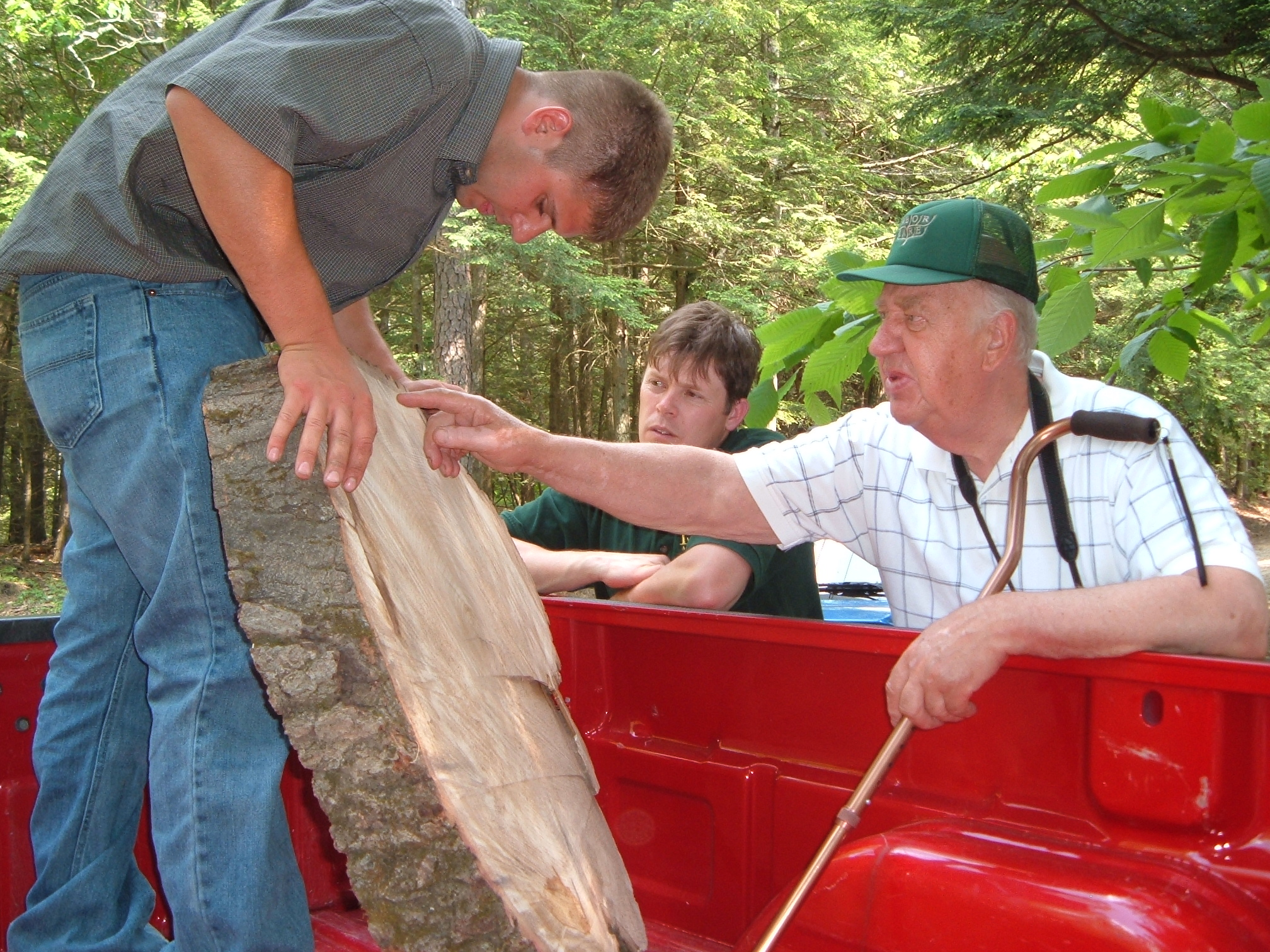
Dr. Alex Shigo (far right) explaining markings on an Oak section during one of his last symposia.

Alex L. Shigo (May 8, 1930 – October 6, 2006) was a biologist and plant pathologist with the United States Forest Service whose studies of tree decay resulted in many improvements to standard arboricultural practices. He travelled and lectured widely to promote understanding of tree biology among arborists and foresters. His large body of primary research serves as a broad foundation for further research in tree biology.

== Biography ==
Shigo was born in Duquesne, Pennsylvania. He served as a clarinetist with the United States Air Force Band in Washington DC for four years during the Korean War. After his service, he earned a Bachelor of Biological Science degree at Waynesburg College in Pennsylvania, then a PhD in Plant Pathology at West Virginia University in 1960. He joined the U.S. Forest Service as a tree pathologist. He served there as Chief Scientist for 25 years and retired in 1985. Shigo was known for his digressive and philosophical style when writing and speaking, and for his trademarked phrase, “touch trees,” with which he autographed his books.

== Research ==
Early in his career, the first one-man chainsaws became available. These enabled him to prepare longitudinal sections of trees, which allowed him to study the longitudinal spread of decay organisms within them. A major discovery from this work was that trees have ways of walling off decaying tissues, which he named Compartmentalization of Decay in Trees (CODIT). This led to reassessment of arboricultural practices such as pruning techniques and cavity treatments, which showed that many then current practices (such as coating cuts with tar) actually promoted decay or were ineffective. The ANSI A-300 Pruning Standard reflects his recommendations.

== Publications ==
Shigo produced over 270 publications, including many research papers, books, pamphlets, CDs, and DVDs. In retirement, he and his wife Marilyn published these as Shigo and Trees, Associates. He traveled the world doing presentations, workshops, seminars and demonstrations, sharing his passion for trees. The Shigo and Trees, Associates business was transferred to their daughter in 2005.

== Major works ==
- A New Tree Biology and Dictionary
- Modern Arboriculture - Touch Trees
- Tree Anatomy
