= Tree injection =

Method of applying pesticides

Cartoon depicting tree injection

Trunk injection or endotherapy also known as vegetative endotherapy, is a method of target-precise application of pesticides, plant resistance activators, or fertilizers into the xylem vascular tissue of a tree with the purpose of protecting the tree from pests, or to inject nutrients to correct for nutrient deficiencies. This method largely relies on harnessing the tree's vascular system to translocate and distribute the active compounds into the wood, canopy and roots where protection or nutrition is needed.

Trunk injection/endotherapy is currently the most popular method for control of damaging insects, pathogens, and nematodes in landscape tree care.

Endotherapy is the concept when treatments using the appropriate material formulation are carried out from the inside out through xylem translocation in the trunk/stem of plants during the photosynthetic cycle. Trunk injection is an older term that only reflects how the technique is performed.

== History ==
These methods were used from ancient times, Ibn-Al-Awam, is quoted by Hadj de Granade in 1158 as adding colour to flowers and flavours to fruits by injection. Leonardo da Vinci recorded in the fifteenth century the injection of arsenic to kill trees. Many others did experiments on injecting dyes into the plant and observing their translocation. In Russia methods were introduced by Shevyrev in 1894, Roth in Germany in 1896, for chlorosis treatment with ferrous salts by Nicolaev-Tzygankov (1898) and Jaczewski (1910), and for plant protection by the Polish entomologist Zygmunt Mokrzecki.

== Description ==
Endotherapy has been developed primarily for use on large size trees and in proximity of urban areas where ground- and air-spray applications are impractical due to substantial drift-driven pesticide losses or not allowed due to potential human exposure. However, the prime driver of tree injection use has been a wide spread need for control of many invasive tree pathogens and insects pests. The most infamous examples are that of fungi in the genus Ophiostoma that cause Dutch Elm Disease (DED) and the insect known as the emerald ash borer (Agrilus planipennis) which have specific biologies that lead to severe internal damage of wood and thus tree death, and which make their management extremely difficult or inefficient with classical pesticide application methods. Endotherapy for tree protection is viewed as environmentally safer alternative for pesticide application since the compound is delivered within the tree, thus allowing for selective exposure to plant pests. In landscapes and urban zones trunk injection significantly reduces the non-target exposure of water, soil, air, and wildlife to pesticides and fertilizers. In the last 20 years, tree injection is gaining momentum with the development and availability of new, efficient injection devices and injectable and xylem mobile formulations of pesticides, biopesticides and nutrients.

Endotherapy works by adding a water soluble chemical formulation directly into the lower trunk of the tree structure.

== Applications ==
In the past and recently, endotherapeutic treatment using agriculture products has been investigated in the perennial trees for control of pathogens and insect pests on fruit tree crops. The most investigated are diseases and pests of avocado, coconut palm, apple, and grapevine, such as Phytophthora root rot of avocado Phytophthora cinnamomi and avocado thrips Scirtothrips perseae, fire blight Erwinia amylovora and apple scab Venturia inaequalis, oblique banded leaf roller Choristoneura rosaceana and codling moth Cydia pomonella, and grapevine downy mildew Plasmopara viticola and powdery mildew Uncinula necator. Apple trees are especially interesting as a research model in agriculture since it is known that apple production requires intensive spray schedules for control of pathogenic fungus V. inaequalis with as many as 15-22 sprays of fungicides per season in humid climate.

Endotherapy of pesticides is considered as an option for precise compound delivery which will reduce the negative impact of drift-driven pesticide losses in the environment, that occur after aerial or ground spray applications of pesticides. Besides negative consequences of frequent pesticide applications in the environment, trunk injection of grapevines is investigated in viticulture for control of pathogens with difficult biologies, such as Xylella fastidiosa, which infect and destroy woody tissues and that cannot be controlled efficiently by canopy spray applications of fungicides or bactericides. To increase the efficiency of injected compounds in trees and vines, important considerations are plant anatomy, weather and soil conditions, tree physiology processes, spatial and temporal distribution of injected compound, and the chemical properties of injected compound and formulation.
