= Robert Hartig =

German forestry scientist (1839–1901)

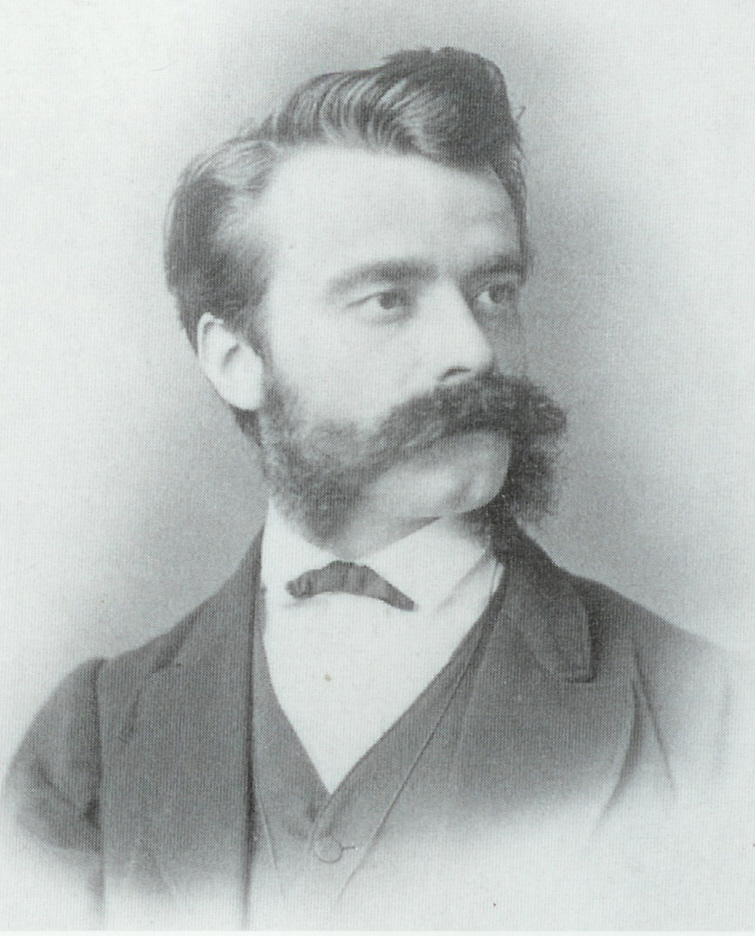
- Robert Hartig, from the book by Otto Dittmar et al. Adam Schwappach. Ein Forstwissenschaftler und sein Erbe. Hanstedt 2001, S. 47
- Born: 30 May 1839; Braunschweig
- Died: 9 October 1901 (aged 62); Munich
- Known for: Hartig net
- Scientific career
- Doctoral students: Heinrich Mayr, Carl von Tubeuf
- Author abbrev. (botany): R.Hartig

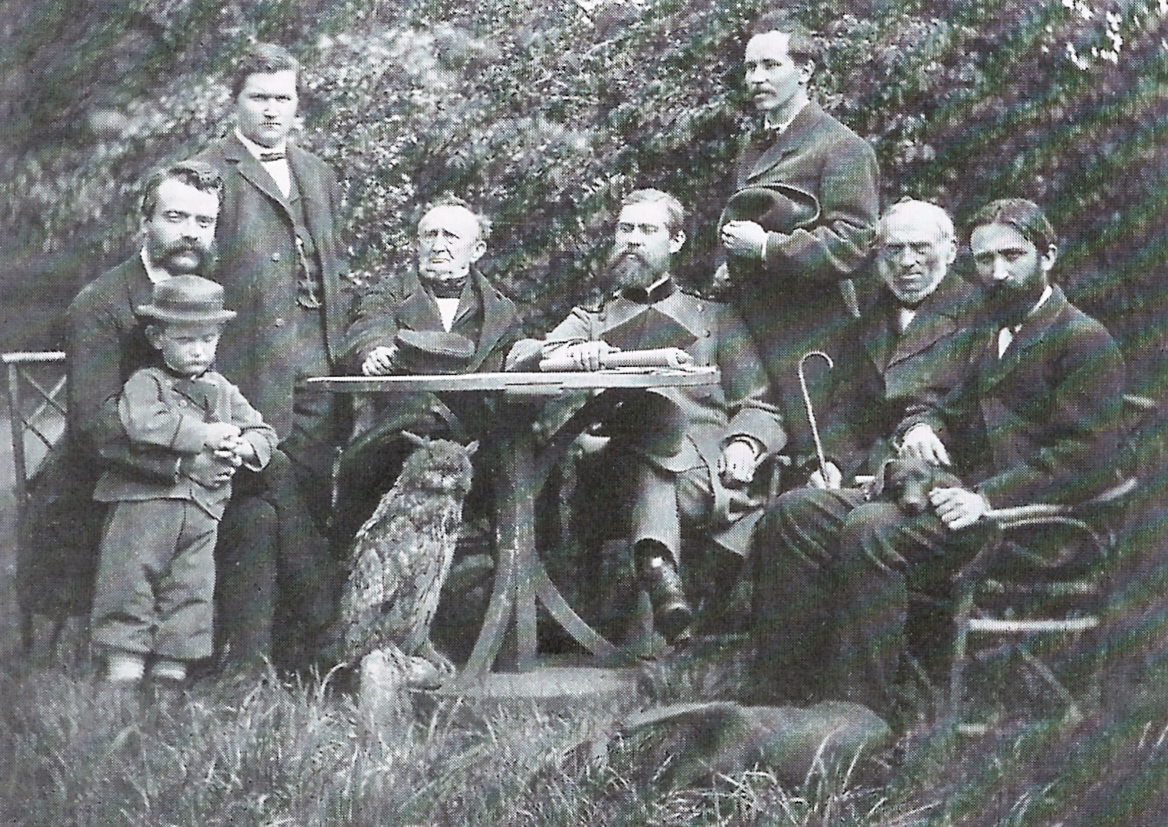
Teachers of the school of forestry in Neustadt-Eberswalde around 1868 (from left): Robert Hartig (with Peter Danckelmann in his arms), unknown, Julius Theodor Christian Ratzeburg, Bernhard Danckelmann, Adolf Remelé, Wilhelm Schneider and Wilhelm Schütze

Robert Hartig (born: Heinrich Julius Adolph Robert Hartig, 30 May 1839, in Braunschweig – died 9 October 1901, in Munich) was a German forestry scientist and mycologist. He has been called the father of forest pathology.

== Biography ==
He was educated at the Collegium Carolinum of Braunschweig, and the Friedrich Wilhelm University of Berlin. In 1878, he was appointed professor of botany at the Ludwig-Maximilians-Universität München. Hartig made significant contributions to knowledge of vegetable pathology. Prior to his investigations on the progressive stages of disease in trees, little or nothing had been done in this area, so that Hartig may be considered the founder of arboreal pathology.

Hartig worked in Eberswalde (1867–1878) and Munich (1878–1901), mainly in forest pathology.

== Works ==
- Vergleichende Untersuchungen über den Wachsthumsgang und Ertrag der Rothbuche und Eiche im Spessart, der Rothbuche im östlichen Wesergebirge, der Kiefer in Pommern und der Weißtanne im Schwarzwalde, Stuttgart 1865.
- Die Rentabilität der Fichtennutzholz- und Buchenbrennholzwirthschaft im Harze und im Wesergebirge. Stuttgart 1868.
- Wichtige Krankheiten der Waldbäume. Beiträge zur Mycologie und Phytopathologie für Botaniker und Forstmänner, Berlin, 1874.
- Die durch Pilze erzeugten Krankheiten der Waldbäume. Für den deutschen Förster. Zweite Auflage. Breslau: Morgenstern, 1875.
- Die Zersetzungserscheinungen des Holzes der Nadelholzbäume und der Eiche in forstlicher botanischer und chemischer Richtung, Berlin, 1878. (Initiated the modern era of understanding of wood decay.)
- Lehrbuch der Baumkrankheiten, Berlin, 1882.

- Lehrbuch der Baumkrankheiten, 2., verb. und vermehrte Auflage, Berlin, 1889.
- 2nd ed. translated into English by William Somerville and H. Marshall Ward as Diseases of Trees, London 1894
- Lehrbuch der Pflanzenkrankheiten. Für Botaniker, Forstleute, Landwirthe und Gärtner, 3., völlig neu bearbeitete Auflage des Lehrbuches der Baumkrankheiten, Berlin 1900.

- Das Holz der deutschen Nadelwaldbäume, Berlin, 1885.
- Der ächte Hausschwamm (Merulius lacrymans Fr.), (Die Zerstörungen des Bauholzes durch Pilze I), Berlin 1885.

- 2nd ed.: Der echte Hausschwamm und andere das Bauholz zerstörende Pilze, 2. Aufl., bearbeitet und herausgegeben von Dr. C. Freiherr von Tubeuf, Berlin, 1902.

- (with Rudolf Weber) Das Holz der Rothbuche in anatomisch-physiologischer, chemischer und forstlicher Richtung, Berlin 1888.
- Lehrbuch der Anatomie und Physiologie der Pflanzen unter besonderer Berücksichtigung der Forstgewächse, Berlin, 1891.
- Die anatomischen Unterscheidungsmerkmale der wichtigeren in Deutschland wachsenden Hölzer, 4. Auflage, Munich 1898.

== Family ==
He was the son of Theodor Hartig (1805–1880) and grandson of Georg Ludwig Hartig (1764–1837).

== See also ==
- Compartmentalization of decay in trees (CODIT)
- Robert Hart (horticulturist) who specialized in forest gardening.
