= Cecil Konijnendijk =

Dutch scientist

Cecil C. Konijnendijk (born 1970) is a Dutch researcher, educator, advisor, and writer working within the fields of urban forestry and urban greening. He co-directs the Nature Based Solutions Institute and is an Honorary Professor at the University of British Columbia's Faculty of Forestry. He is most known for his invention of the 3:30:300 rule.

== Life ==
Cecil Konijnendijk was born in Maurik, and grew up in the Dutch village of Abbenbroek. He studied forestry at Wageningen University and obtained his Doctor of Sciences degree in agricultural and forestry economics from the University of Eastern Finland. He continued his academic career in Denmark, Sweden, Canada, and Spain, before returning to the Netherlands in 2022.

Although trained as a forester, Konijnendijk embarked on a career in the interdisciplinary field of urban forestry. During large parts of his career as a researcher and educator, he worked in landscape architecture and planning departments, including three years as a head of the landscape department at the Swedish University of Agricultural Sciences in Alnarp, Sweden.

He has held full or visiting professorships at the University of Copenhagen, Swedish University of Agricultural Sciences, The University of Hong Kong, the University of British Columbia, KU Leuven (the Katholieke Universiteit Leuven), and several Chinese universities. In 2020 he co-founded the Nature Based Solutions Institute, a think tank for the evidence-based greening of cities across the world.

== Research ==
Together with colleagues at the then Danish Centre for Forest and Landscape, Konijnendijk helped set up a network of European researchers in the field of urban forestry. He has been a key driver behind the European Forum on Urban Forestry, a platform for practitioners and researchers in urban forestry for the exchange of ideas and experience.

Konijnendijk led large European-funded projects like Neighbourwoods and GREENSURGE. In 2002 he co-founded the scientific journal Urban Forestry & Urban Greening, currently the leading journal in the field of urban forestry. He served as editor-in-chief for 18 years. Since 2021 he has been editor-in-chief of another journal, Arboriculture and Urban Forestry.

== Other contributions ==
In February 2021, Konijnendijk proposed a new guideline for the evidence-based greening of cities, the 3:30:300 rule. The rule emphasises the importance of being able to see mature trees, live amongst trees, and have high-quality public green space within easy reach. The rule has since found wide application in cities and towns around the world.

Konijnendijk served on the board of international organised such as the European Forest Institute, World Urban Parks, the International Society of Arboriculture, and the International Union of Forest Research Organizations. He advised international organisations like FAO (Food and Agriculture Organization), the United Nations Economic Commission for Europe, and the Nordic Council of Ministers on their urban forestry activities.

Konijnendijk is an International Fellow of the Royal Swedish Academy of Agriculture and Forestry, a Fellow of the UK Landscape Institute, and an Honorary Fellow of the Institute of Chartered Foresters. The International Society of Arboriculture awarded him with the L .C. Chadwick Award for Arboricultural Research (2013) and the Sharon J. Lilly Award of Achievement (2021) for his work. In 2022 he was awarded the International Francqui Professor Chair by the Francqui Foundation of Belgium. Two Belgian universities, KU Leuven and UCLouvain (the Université catholique de Louvain), co-sponsored the award application and his Francqui professorship programme.
