= Treetop Cat Rescue =

- Country of origin: United States
- Original language: English
- No. of seasons: 1
- No. of episodes: 10

Original release
- Network: Animal Planet
- Release: May 30 – July 25, 2015

Treetop Cat Rescue is a television series that aired on the American television channel Animal Planet. It is a reality television program about a team who rescues housecats stuck in trees. The program originally aired on Saturday evenings. Cats are helped down from the trees by a company called Canopy Cat Rescue, who use their own equipment and expertise as arborists to try to bring down cats at no charge to the animal owners.

== Episodes ==
No.	Title	Original release date
1	"Out on a Limb"	May 30, 2015
Tom must navigate a sloping tree to rescue a difficult cat; Shaun faces wet and damp conditions to save a friendly, homesick stray.
2	"Cat Men to the Rescue"	May 30, 2015
After a team effort to rescue Bear the cat, Shaun goes solo on night mission to find 3-week missing cat, Spaz; call about feral cat in woman's backyard, leads to great danger.
3	"Promeo, Promeo!"	June 6, 2015
Shaun and Tom investigate whether someone who claims to be a cat's owner really is; Tom tries to reunite a cat with his dog friend; brittle tree makes things tough on a night rescue.
4	"Top Cats"	June 6, 2015
Tom is called out to Olympia on a late night rescue mission; neighborhood dog chases large, indoor cat, Earl, high up on a tree, and doesn't exactly let Tom rescue him; Play-Play needs rescuing in La Conner.
5	"Repeat Offender"	June 13, 2015
Tigger, a repeat offender, has done it again and Shaun must battle high winds this time to get him down; Tom comes face to face with a friendly Fritter, who turns hostile on a dime
6	"Cat Scratch Fever"	June 20, 2015
Tom tries to reunite the not-so-sweet, Cake with its owners; Tom rescues a cat that will not let go of him in Burien.
7	"Wedged In a Hedge"	July 18, 2015
Not-so-friendly Ruby is trapped in a dense evergreen hedge; Shaun must hurry to stop a scared cat named Fuzz from jumping out of a tree.
8	"Kitty, Can You Hear Me?"	July 18, 2015
Hostile repeat offender Mow Mow is stuck in yet another tree in Eatonville; Shaun is called to rescue his first-ever deaf cat, Snow, in Seattle.
9	"Twin Tops"	July 25, 2015
Shaun flies from treetop to treetop in an attempt to rescue indoor cat, Simon; unpredictable, repeat offender Malcolm must be rescued once again.
10	"Kitty Kitty, Tree Tree"	July 25, 2015
Tom reunites Felix with his concerned family; Shaun brings a feral cat, Pepper, down from a huge rainstorm; Tom races to save overly friendly cat, Hanna, who is about to fall.
