= Arborist =

Occupation concerning the care of perennial woody plants

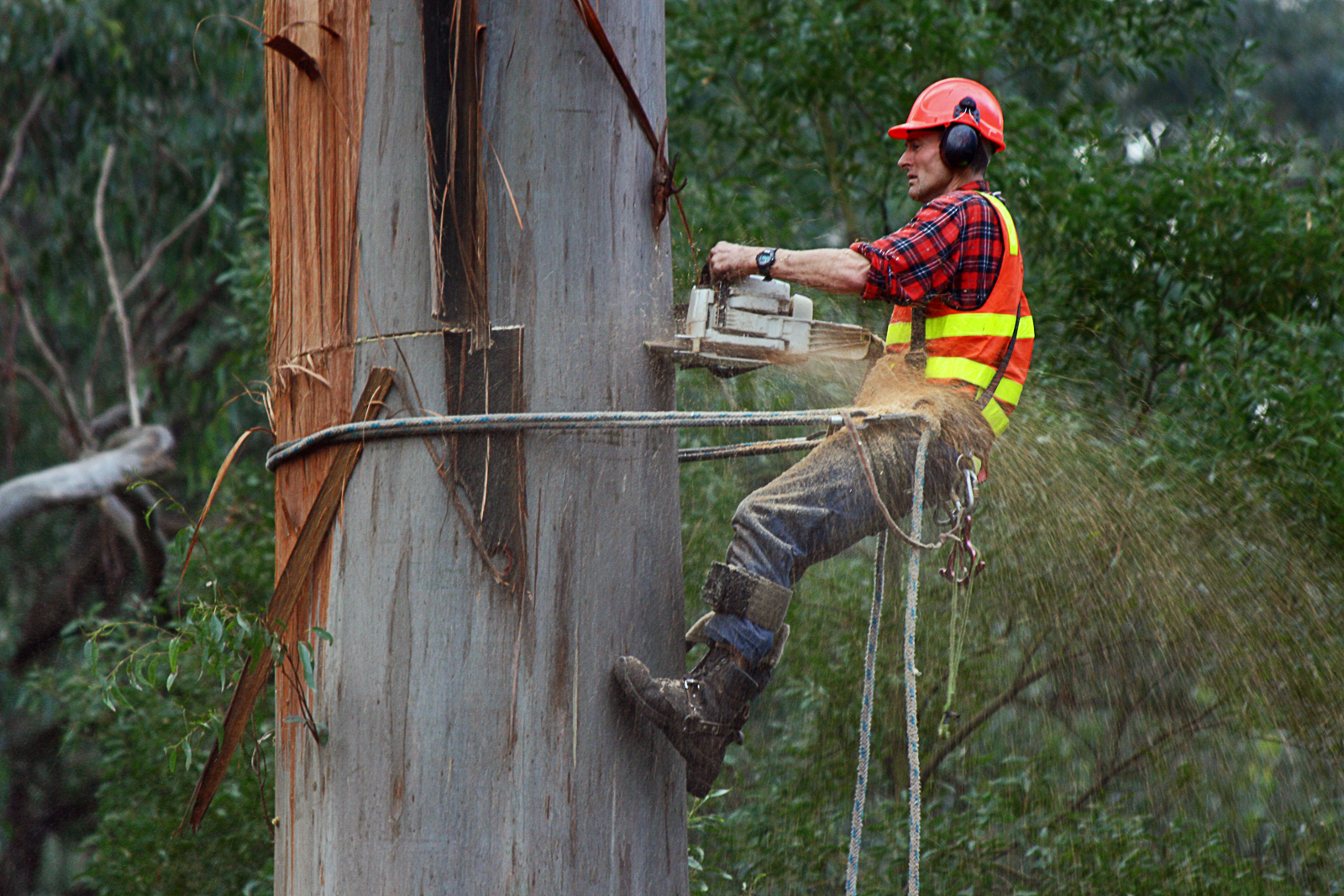
An arborist using a chainsaw to cut a eucalyptus tree in a public park

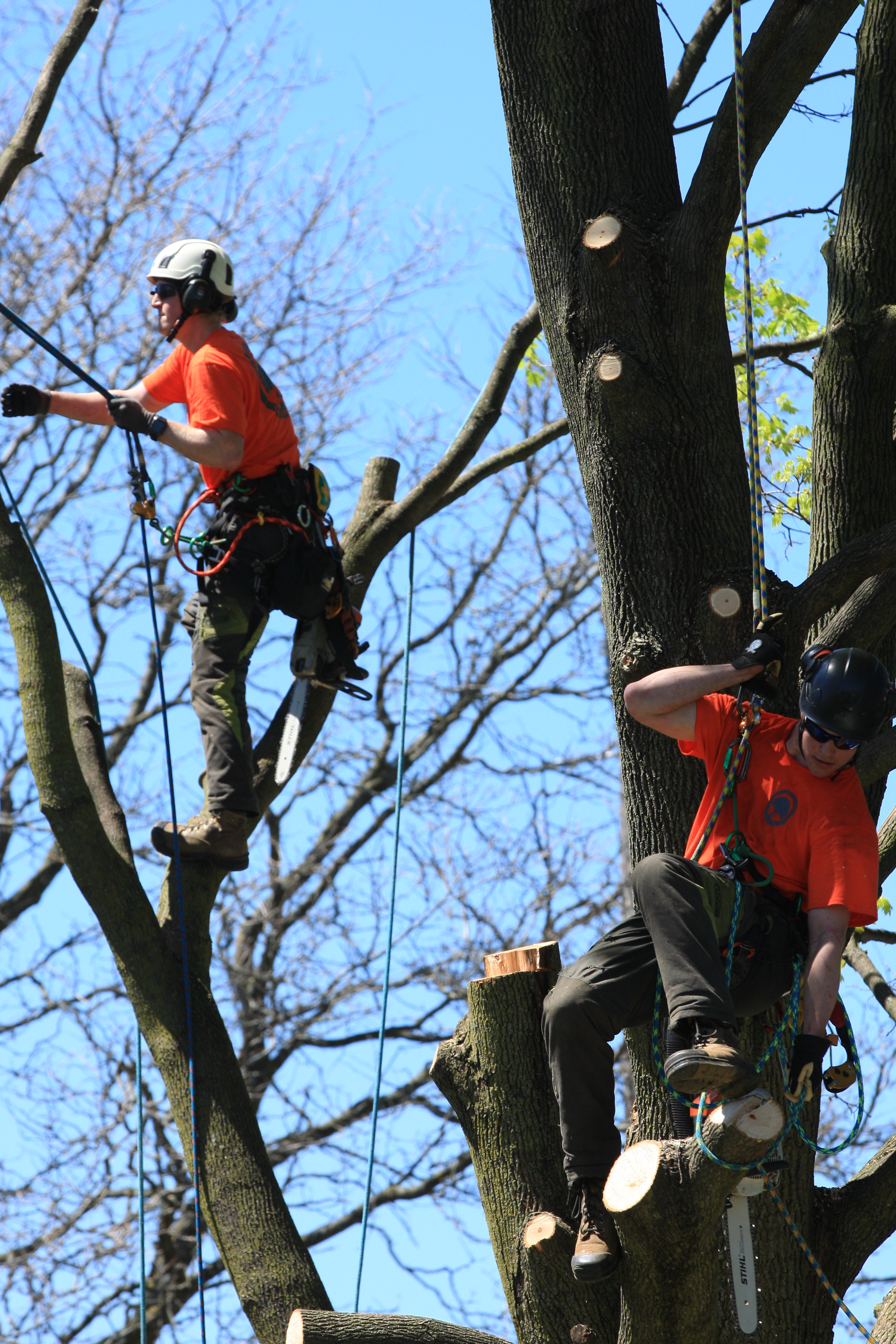
Two arborists climbing and dismantling a Norway Maple in Ontario, Canada

An arborist, or (less commonly) arboriculturist, is a professional in the practice of arboriculture, which is the cultivation, management, and study of individual trees, shrubs, vines, and other perennial woody plants in dendrology and horticulture.

Arborists generally focus on the health and safety of individual plants and trees, rather than managing forests or harvesting wood (silviculture or forestry). An arborist's scope of work is therefore distinct from that of either a forester or a logger.

== Scope of work ==
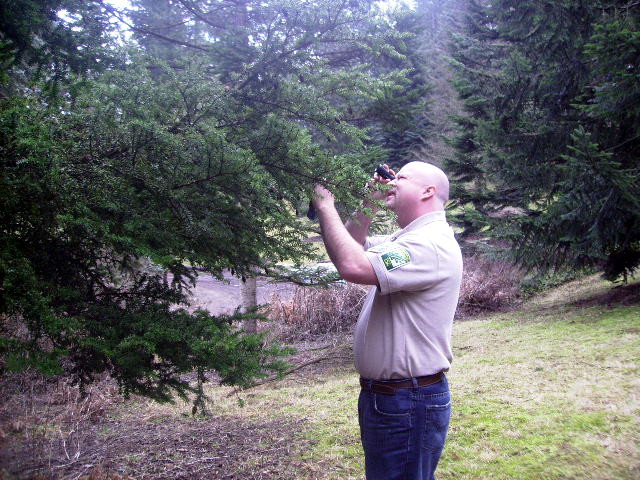
An ISA Certified municipal arborist examining a Japanese Hemlock at Hoyt Arboretum in Portland, Oregon

In order for arborists to work near power wires, either additional training is required or they need to be certified as a Qualified Line Clearance Arborist or Utility Arborist (there may be different terminology for various countries). There is a variety of minimum distances that must be kept from power wires depending on voltage, however the common distance for low voltage lines in urban settings is 10 feet (about 3 metres).

Arborists who climb (as not all do) can use a variety of techniques to ascend into the tree. The least invasive, and most popular technique used is to ascend on rope. There are two common methods of climbing, Stationary Rope System (SRS) and Moving Rope System (MRS). When personal safety is an issue, or the tree is being removed, arborists may use 'spikes', (also known as 'gaffs' or 'spurs') attached to their chainsaw boots with straps to ascend and work. Spikes wound the tree, leaving small holes where each step has been.

An arborist's work may involve very large and complex trees, or ecological communities and their abiotic components in the context of the landscape ecosystem. These may require monitoring and treatment to ensure they are healthy, safe, and suitable to property owners or community standards. This work may include some or all of the following: planting; transplanting; pruning; structural support; preventing, or diagnosing and treating phytopathology or parasitism; preventing or interrupting grazing or predation; installing lightning protection; and removing vegetation deemed as hazardous, an invasive species, a disease vector, or a weed.

Arborists may also plan, consult, write reports and give legal testimony. While some aspects of this work are done on the ground or in an office, much of it is done by arborists who perform tree services and who climb the trees with ropes, harnesses and other equipment. Lifts and cranes may be used too. The work of all arborists is not the same. Some may just provide a consulting service; others may perform climbing, pruning and planting: whilst others may provide a combination of all of these services.

== Qualifications ==
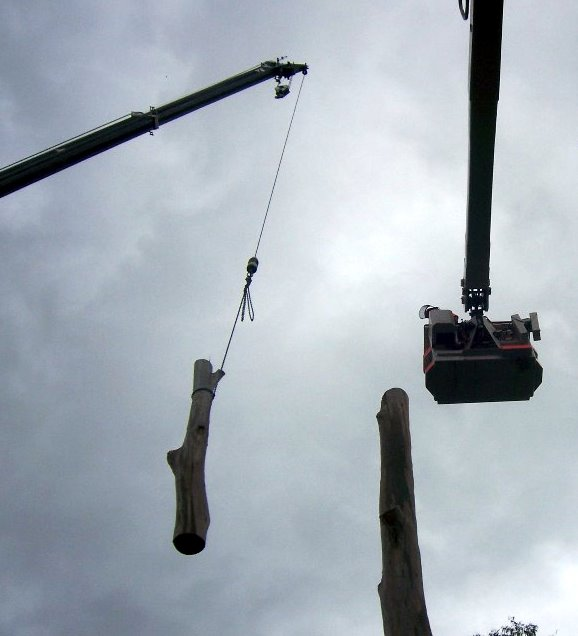
An arborist disassembling a tree using a crane and bucket

Arborists choose to pursue formal certification, which is available in some countries and varies somewhat by location. An arborist who holds certification in one or more disciplines may be expected to participate in rigorous continuing education requirements to ensure constant improvement of skills and techniques.

In Australia, arboricultural education and training are streamlined countrywide through a multi-disciplinary vocational education, training, and qualification authority called the Australian Qualifications Framework, which offers varying levels of professional qualification. Government institutions including Technical and Further Education (TAFE) offer Certificate III or a diploma in arboriculture as well as some universities. There are also many private institutions covering similar educational framework in each state. Recognition of prior learning is also an option for practicing arborists with 10 or more years of experience with no prior formal training. It allows them to be assessed and fast track their certification.

In France, a qualified arborist must hold a Management of Ornamental Trees certificate, and a qualified arborist climber must hold a Pruning and Care of Trees certificate; both delivered by the French Ministry of Agriculture.

In the UK, an arborist can gain qualifications up to and including a master's degree. College-based courses include further education qualifications, such as national certificate, national diploma, while higher education courses in arboriculture include foundation degree, bachelor's degree and master's degree.

In the US, a Certified Arborist (CA) is a professional who has over three years of documented and verified experience and has passed a rigorous written test from the International Society of Arboriculture. Other designations include Municipal Specialist, Utility Specialist and Board Certified Master Arborist (BCMA). The USA and Canada additionally have college-based training which, if passed, will give the certificate of Qualified Arborist. The Qualified Arborist can then be used to offset partial experience towards the Certified Arborist.

Tree Risk Assessment Qualified credential (TRAQ), designed by the International Society of Arboriculture, was launched in 2013. At that time people holding the TRACE credential were transferred over to the TRAQ credential.

In Canada, there are provincially governed apprenticeship programs that allow arborists' to work near power lines upon completion. These apprenticeship programs must meet the provincial reregulations (For example, in B.C. they must meet WorkSafeBC G19.30), and individuals must ensure they meet the requirements of the owner of the power system.

== Cultural practices ==
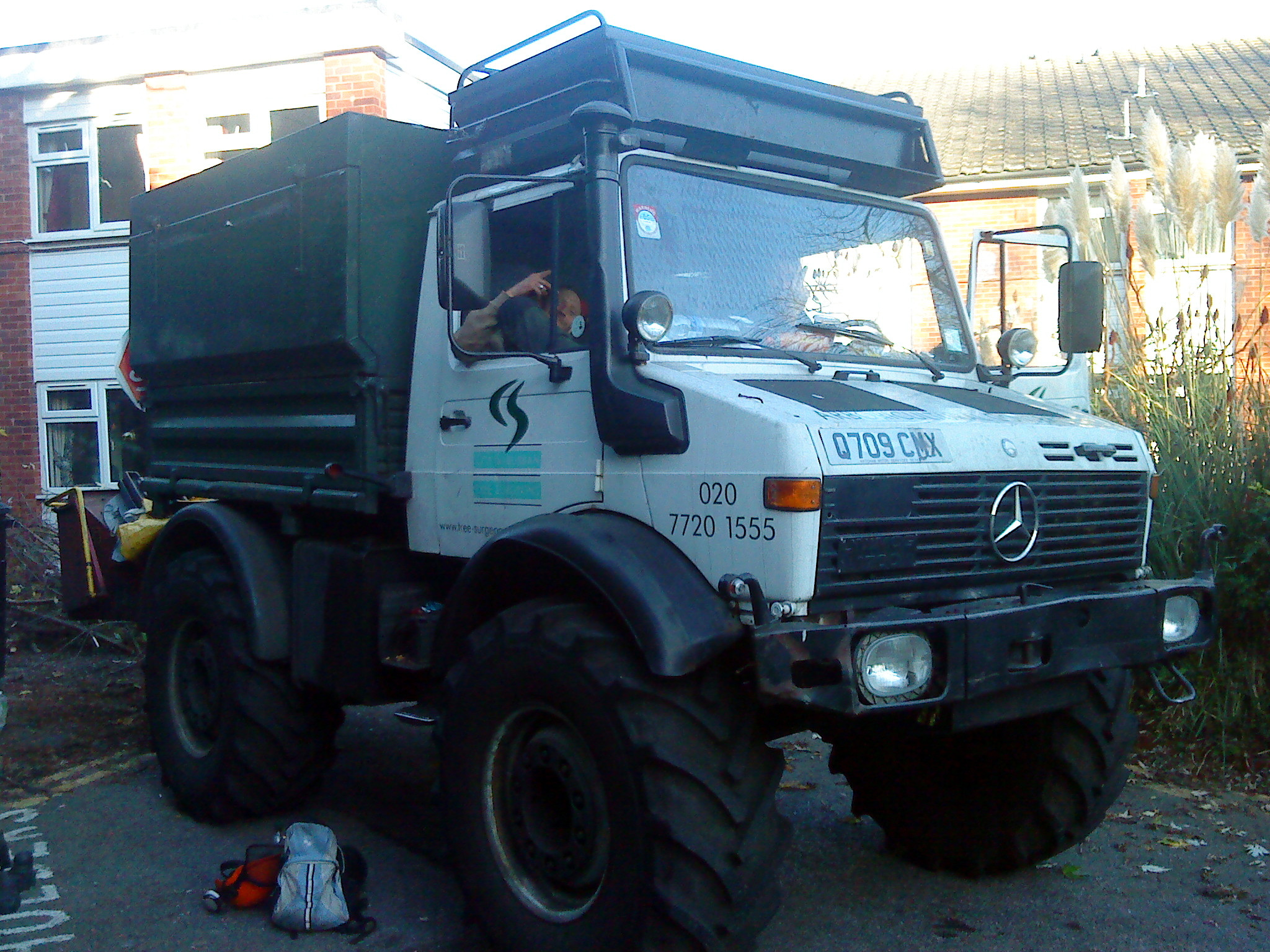
Arborists may use specialised vehicles to gain access to trees, such as this Unimog equipped with a power take-off driven woodchipper

Trees in urban landscape settings are often subject to disturbances, whether human or natural, both above and below ground. They may require care to improve their chances of survival following damage from either biotic or abiotic causes. Arborists can provide appropriate solutions, such as pruning trees for health and good structure, for aesthetic reasons, and to permit people to walk under them (a technique often referred to as "crown raising"), or to keep them away from wires, fences, and buildings (a technique referred to as "crown reduction"). Timing and methods of treatment depend on the species of tree and the purpose of the work. To determine the best practices, a thorough knowledge of local species and environments is essential.

There can be a vast difference between the techniques and practices of professional arborists and those of inadequately trained tree workers. Some commonly offered "services" are considered unacceptable by modern arboricultural standards and may seriously damage, disfigure, weaken, or even kill trees. One such example is tree topping, lopping, or "hat-racking", where entire tops of trees or main stems are removed, generally by cross-cutting the main stem(s) or leaders, leaving large unsightly stubs. Trees that manage to survive such treatment are left prone to a spectrum of detrimental effects, including vigorous but weakly attached regrowth, pest susceptibility, pathogen intrusion, and internal decay.

Pruning should only be done with a specific purpose in mind. Every cut is a wound, and every leaf lost is a removal of photosynthesis potential. Proper pruning can be helpful in many ways, but should always be done with the minimum amount of live tissue removed.

In recent years, research has proven that wound dressings such as paint, tar, or other coverings are unnecessary and may harm trees. The coverings may encourage growth of decay-causing fungi. Proper pruning, by cutting through branches at the right location, can do more to limit decay than wound dressing

Chemicals can be applied to trees for insect or disease control through soil application, stem injections, or spraying. Compacted or disturbed soils can be improved in various ways.

Arborists can also assess trees to determine the health, structure, safety, or feasibility within a landscape and in proximity to humans. Modern arboriculture has progressed in technology and sophistication from practices of the past. Many current practices are based on knowledge gained through recent research, including that of Alex Shigo, considered one "father" of modern arboriculture.

== Legal issues ==
Depending on the jurisdiction, there may be a number of legal issues surrounding the practices of arborists, including boundary issues, public safety issues, "heritage" trees of community value, and "neighbour" issues such as ownership, obstruction of views, impacts of roots crossing boundaries, nuisance problems, disease or insect quarantines, and safety of nearby trees or plants that may be affected.

Arborists are frequently consulted to establish the factual basis of disputes involving trees, or by private property owners seeking to avoid legal liability through the duty of care. Arborists may be asked to assess the value of a tree in the process of an insurance claim for trees damaged or destroyed, or to recover damages resulting from tree theft or vandalism. In cities with tree preservation orders an arborist's evaluation of tree hazard may be required before a property owner may remove a tree, or to assure the protection of trees in development plans and during construction operations. Carrying out work on protected trees and hedges is illegal without express permission from local authorities, and can result in legal action including fines. Homeowners who have entered into contracts with a Homeowner's association (see also Restrictive covenants) may need an arborists' professional opinion of a hazardous condition prior to removing a tree, or may be obligated to assure the protection of the views of neighboring properties prior to planting a tree or in the course of pruning. Arborists may be consulted in forensic investigations where the evidence of a crime can be determined within the growth rings of a tree, for example. Arborists may be engaged by one member of a dispute in order to identify factual information about trees useful to that member of the dispute, or they can be engaged as an expert witness providing unbiased scientific knowledge in a court case. Homeowners associations seeking to write restrictive covenants, or legislative bodies seeking to write laws involving trees, may seek the counsel of arborists in order to avoid future difficulties.

Before undertaking works in the UK, arborists have a legal responsibility to survey trees for wildlife, especially bats, which are given particular legal protection. In addition, any tree in the UK can be covered by a tree preservation order and it is illegal to conduct any work on a tree, including deadwooding or pruning, before permission has been sought from the local council.

== Organizations ==
- Australia Limited, a non-profit organisation, is a national organisation promoting and representing tree workers, arborists, professional tree management and urban forestry throughout Australia and the Asia-Pacific region.
- The International Society of Arboriculture, a non-profit organization, maintains a list of ISA Certified Arborists who have passed a written exam and demonstrated a basic level of knowledge in arboriculture. There are also additional classifications of certified arborists with Certified Arborist/Utility Specialist for those who work near power lines, and Certified Arborist/Municipal Specialist for those who deal mostly with community trees. Other certifications exist for Certified Tree Workers, and the highest level of certification, the Board Certified Master Arborist.
- The American Society of Consulting Arborists is an organization whose membership is exclusive to those with a certain level of industry experience, plus higher educational experience or continuing education; some members may achieve a higher status by fulfilling the requirements to become a Registered Consulting Arborist. Consulting arborists generally specialize in the areas of ethics, law, land planning and development, and tree valuation, among others. Consulting arborists are often called on for legal testimony and report writing in various instances where a particular authority on trees is necessary for consequent actions.
- In the UK, the professional body representing the sector is the Institute of Chartered Foresters. The trade body representing arborists is the Arboricultural Association. The association maintains a register of consultants who have demonstrated a high level of technical arboricultural knowledge and operate an Approved Contractor scheme. This scheme assesses both the technical competence and business practices of arboricultural contractors.
- The European Arboricultural Council is a European group of multiple arboriculture organizations from various countries.
- Plant Amnesty is a public education and advocacy group, based in Seattle, dedicated to promoting proper pruning methods. Founded in 1987, Plant Amnesty became an international resource for arborists and their clients in the mid-1990s.
- Trees are Good Is the public outreach arm of the ISA.
- The Tree Care Industry Association is a valuable resource for the buisnesss of arboriculture.
- Saluting Branches is a US based initiative to provide volunteer arboricultural services to veteran cemeteries across the nation

== In literature ==
The protagonist in Italo Calvino's novel The Baron in the Trees lives life on the ground as a boy and spends the rest of his life swinging from tree to tree in the Italian countryside. As a young man he helps the local fruit farmers by pruning their trees.

== Notable arborists ==
Some noteworthy arborists include:

- Francis A. Bartlett – founded The Bartlett Tree Experts Co., the world's leading scientific tree and shrub care company in 1907.
- John Chapman – pioneering U.S. frontier nurseryman and orchardist, commonly known as Johnny Appleseed.
- Canopy Cat Rescue – rescues domestic cats from tall trees; appears on Treetop Cat Rescue.
- Sebastian Junger – author of Perfect Storm and War. Previous to becoming a journalist, Sebastian was an arborist in Massachusetts.
- Chuck Leavell – two-time recipient of the Georgia Tree Farmer of the Year award, and author of the children's book, The Tree Farmer. In 2006 Leavell was appointed by Governor Sonny Perdue to the Georgia Land Conservation Council. He is also an accomplished jazz pianist and keyboardist for the Rolling Stones.
- Alex Shigo – considered the father of modern arboriculture.

• Basil Camu - author of From Wasteland to Wonder and co-founder of Leaf & Limb, the first tree care company to stop the practice of removing healthy trees and the first in the industry to become a certified B Corp.

== Gallery ==
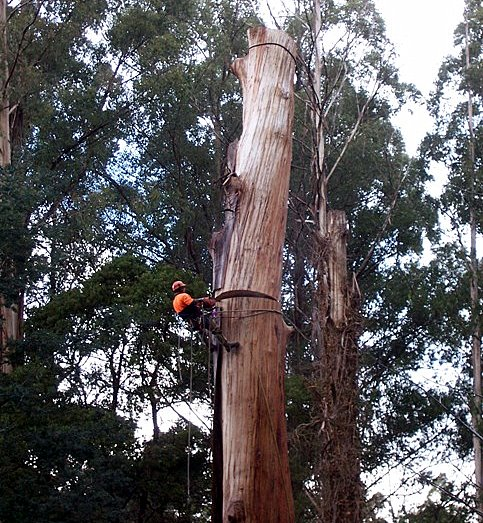
An arborist blocking down a section in Victoria, Australia

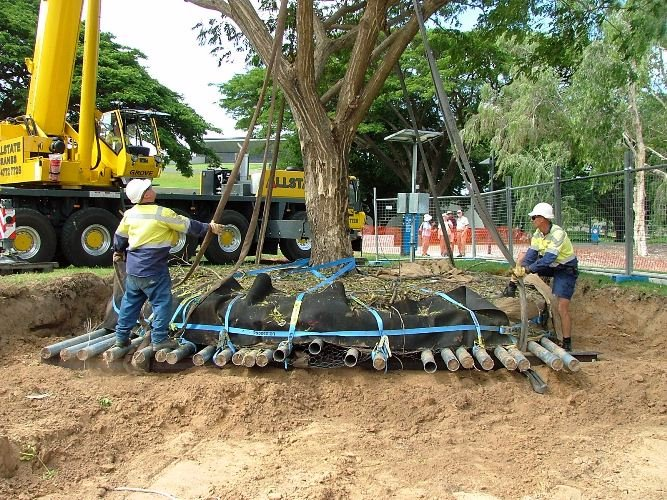
Large tree transplant in Townsville, Australia

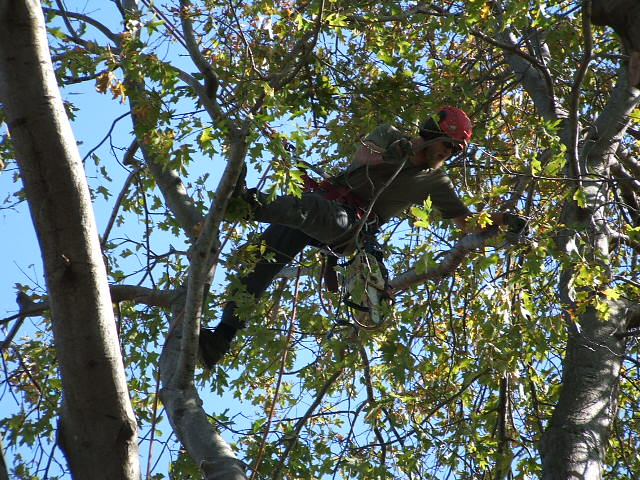
An arborist spurless climbing to prune a tree Australia

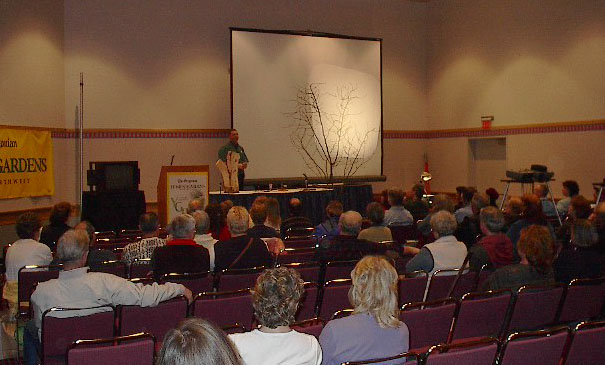
An Oregon arborist providing a slideshow presentation about tree care and pruning at a garden show in Portland, Oregon

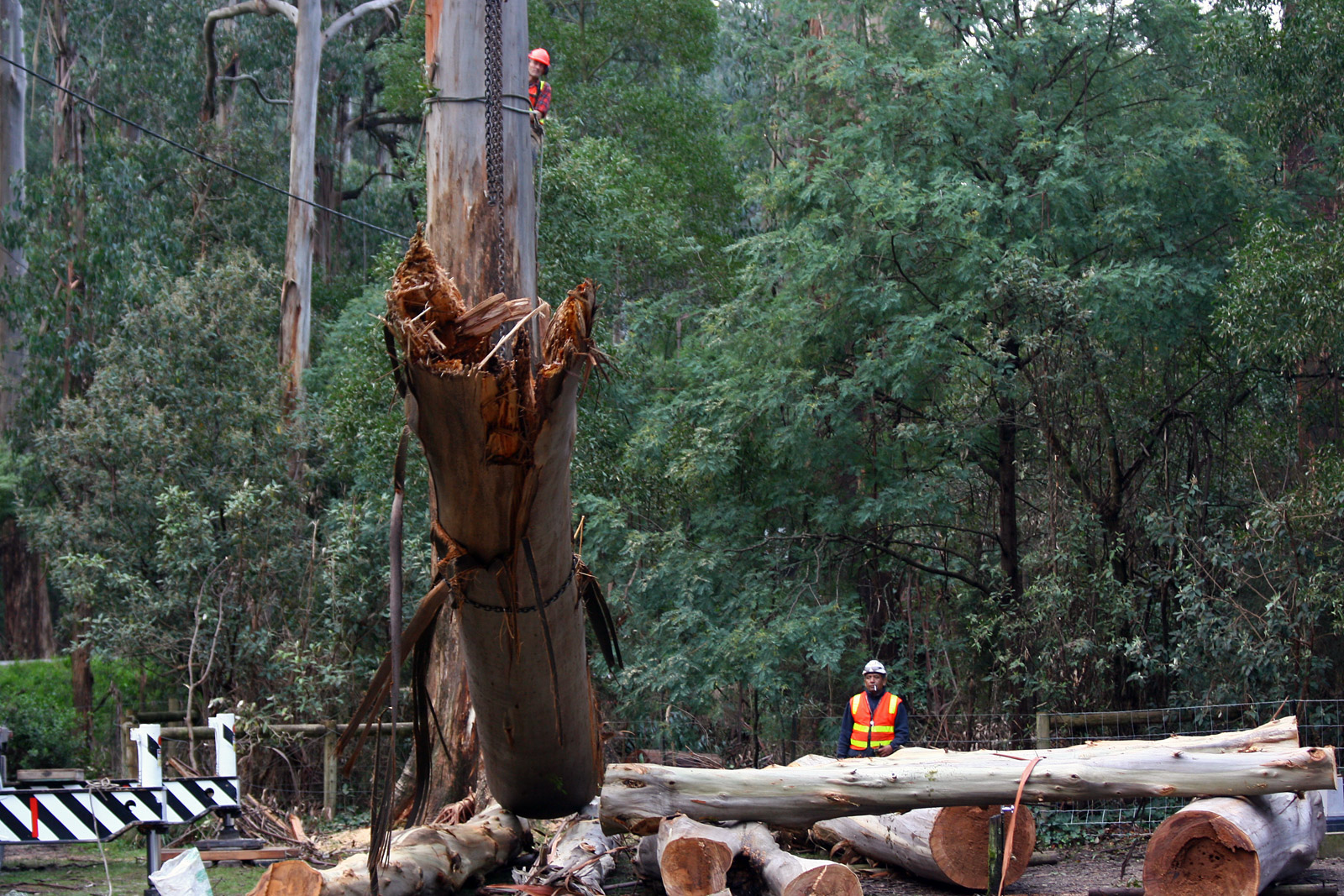
A crew of arborists felling a tree in sections at Kallista, Victoria

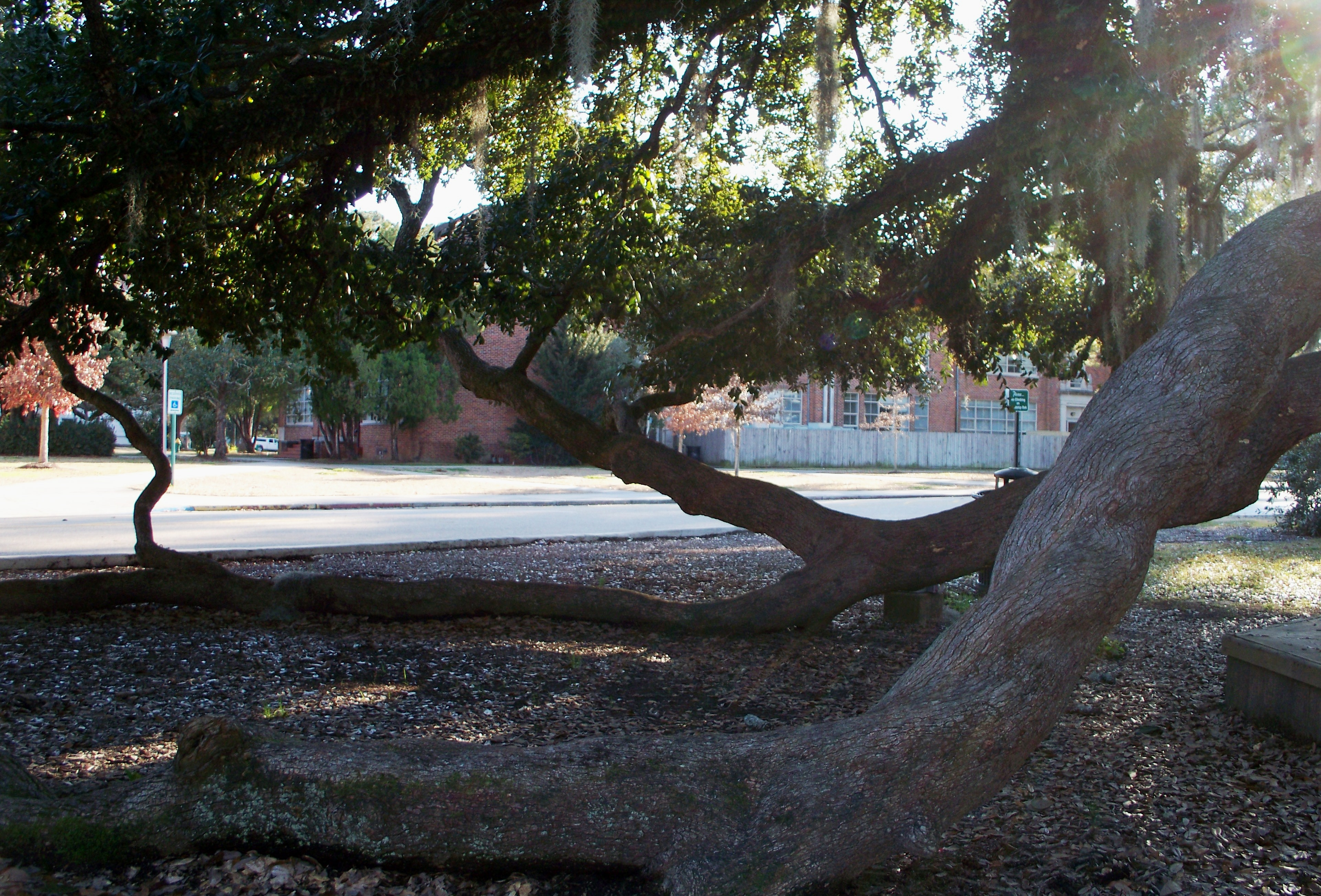
Friendship Oak on the campus of Southeastern Louisiana University is hundreds of years old. Like other mature spreading oaks, Friendship Oak is maintained by arborists to prevent the limbs from growing into the ground.

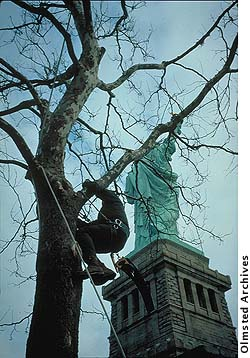
An arborist pruning a tree near the Statue of Liberty

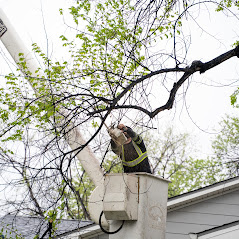
An Arborist Tree Trimming In Denver, Colorado

== See also ==
- Chainsaw safety clothing
- Lumberjack
- Master arborist
- Tree shaping
