= Urban Forestry and Urban Greening =

- Discipline: Forestry
- Language: English
- Edited by: Wendy Chen

Publication details
- History: 2002-present
- Publisher: Urban & Fischer
- Open access: Hybrid
- Impact factor: 5.766 (2021)

Standard abbreviations
- ISO 4: Urban For. Urban Green.

Indexing
- ISSN: 1618-8667 (print); 1610-8167 (web)
- LCCN: 2002220391
- OCLC no.: 819006472
- OCLC no.: 51232031

Links
- Journal homepage; Online archive

Urban Forestry and Urban Greening is a peer-reviewed scientific journal published by Urban & Fischer, an imprint of Elsevier. The editor-in-chief is Wendy Chen. Coverage includes research regarding urban and peri-urban forests and other nearby vegetation. It was co-founded in 2002 by Thomas Barfoed Randrup and Cecil Konijnendijk.

== Abstracting and indexing ==
This journal is indexed and abstracted in:

- Science Citation Index Expanded
- Social Sciences Citation Index
- Biological Abstracts
- BIOSIS Previews
- Current Contents/Agriculture, Biology & Environmental Sciences
- Current Contents/Social and Behavioral Science
- GEOBASE
- Scopus

== See also ==
- Urban area
