= European Arboricultural Council =

Professional arborists organization

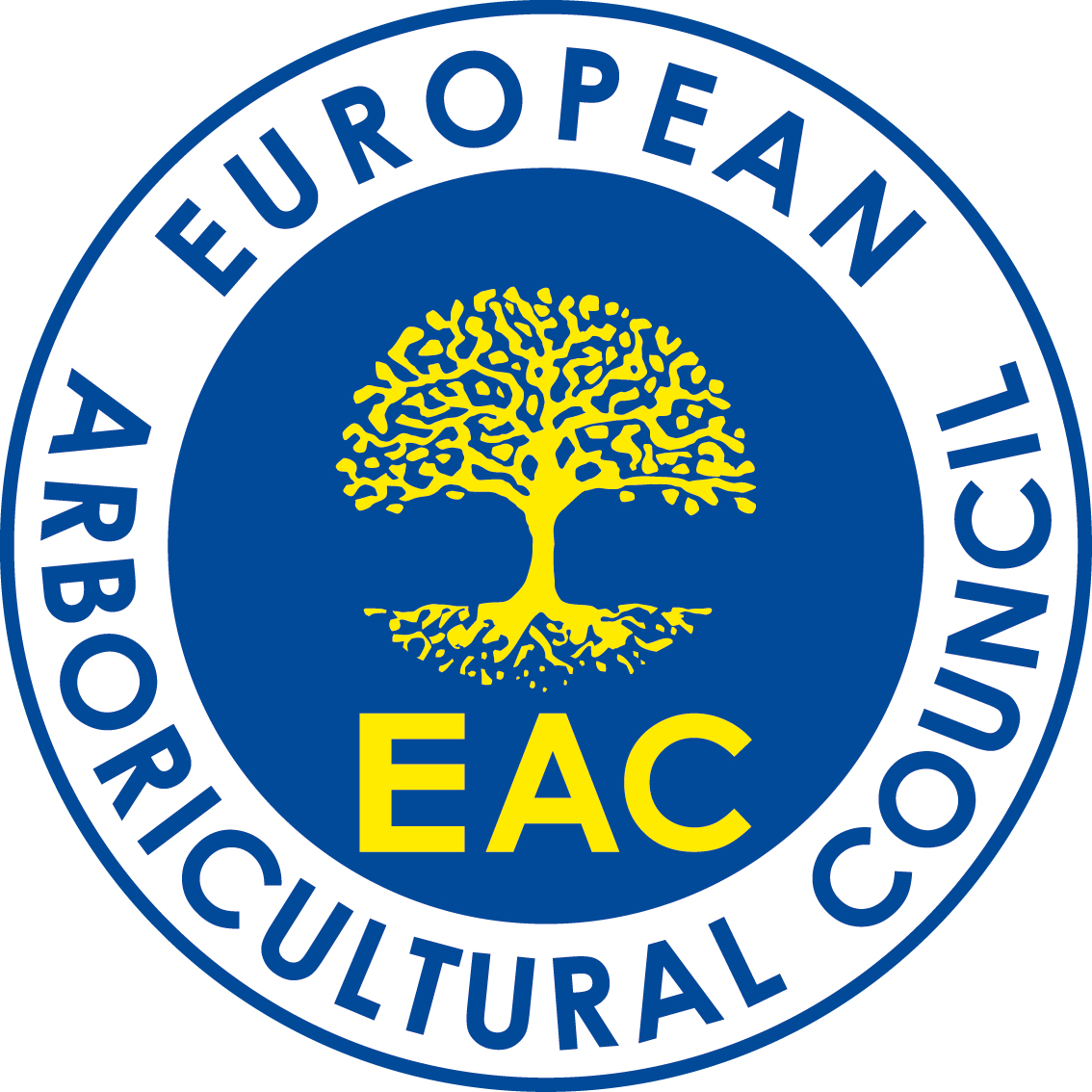
- Abbreviation: EAC
- Formation: 1992
- Purpose: To elevate the status and to raise the professional level of competence within arboriculture
- Members: 28 European nations
- Chairperson: Michal Zelenák, Slovakia
- Website: http://www.eac-arboriculture.com/

The European Arboricultural Council (EAC) is a forum where delegates from a wide range of arboricultural organizations throughout Europe meet. The goal of the EAC is to elevate the status and to raise the professional level of competence within arboriculture. This objective is carried out by liaising on matters ranging from research and education to successful tree establishment and the improvement of safe working practices.

== Objectives ==
The EAC coordinates and represents the interests of the European arboriculture towards appropriate governing bodies and individuals in order to achieve improvements in the fields of:

- The profession of Arboriculture
- Research on urban trees
- tree planting in urban conditions
- Education and training in Arboriculture
- Safe working practices
- Tree management
- Disease and pest control
- Harmonization in tree care procedures in Europe

== Working groups ==
The EAC is divided into the following working groups:

- Certification and Quality Management working group
- Question Bank working group
- European City of the Trees Award working group
- Arboriculture Research and Development Grant Scheme working group
- European Tree Worker Handbook
- EAC Homepage working group

== Members ==
The following countries are members of the European Arboriculture Council:

- Austria

   - ISA Chapter Austria home page

- Belgium

   - Belgian Arborists Associations (BAAs) home page

- Bulgaria

   - Bulgarian Arborist Association home page

- Croatia

   - Croatian Arboricultural Council / Hrvatska udruga za Arborikulturu (HUA) home page

   - Croatian Forestry Society / Hrvatsko šumarsko društvo - HŠD home page

- Czech Republic

   - Czech Tree Care Section - The Czech Chapter of ISA of the Czech Landscape and Garden Society / Spolecnost pro zahradni a krajinarskou tvorbu, z.s. (SZKT) 
   home page

   - Czech Union for Nature Conservation / Český svaz ochránců přírody (ČSOP) home page

- Denmark

   - Dansk Traplejeforening home page

- Estonia

   - Estonian Arboricultural Association / Eesti Arboristide Ühing home page

- Finland

   - Finnish Tree Care Association home page

- France

   - French Arboricultural Society / Société Française d’Arboriculture (SFA) home page

   - Group of Experts Consultants in Ornamental Arboriculture / Groupement des Experts Conseilsen Arboriculture Ornementale (GECAO) home page

- Germany

   - Interessenvertretung Deutsche Baumpflege - Germany home page

- Greece

   - Greek National Union of Landscape Industry (PEEGEP) home page)

- Hungary

   - Hungarian Arborists Association / Magyar Faápolók Egyesülete home page)

- Italy

   - Italian Society of Arboriculture / S.I.A. Società Italiana di Arboricoltura home page

- Latvia

   - Latvijas Kokkopju-Arboristu Biedriba home page

- Lithuania

   - Lithuanian Arborists Association (LARA) home page

   - Experts of Landscape and Greenery (LGEG) / Kraštovaizdžio ir želdynų ekspertų grupė - KŽEG home page

- Netherlands

   - Royal Dutch Association of Landscapers and Gardeners (VHG) / Koninklijke Vereniging van Hoveniers en Groenvoorzieners VHG Platform Boomspecialisten home page

- Norway

   - Norsk Trepleie Forum home page

- Poland

   - Polish Arboricultural Council

   - Federation of Polish Arborists / Stowarzyszenie "Federacja Arborystów Polskich" home page

- Romania

   - Romanian Arboricultural Association / Asociatia Romana de Arboricultura (ARA) home page
   
   - Romanian Arborist Association / Asociatia Arboristilor din Romania (AAR)

- Russia

   - ZDOROVY LES NPSA (membership resting) home page

- Serbia

   - Society of Landscape Horticulture of Serbia home page

- Slovakia

   - International Society of Arboriculture, AO Slovakia / ISA Slovensko home page

- Spain

   - Spanish Association of Arboriculture / Asociación Española de Arboricultura (AEA) home page

- Sweden

   - Svenska Trädföreningen home page

- Switzerland

   - Bund Schweizer Baumpflege home page

- Ukraine

   - Ukrainian Arboricultural Association home page

- United Kingdom / Ireland

   - The Arboricultural Association home page

== See also ==
- European City of the Trees
