= International Society of Arboriculture =

International non-profit botanical organization

The International Society of Arboriculture, commonly known as ISA, is an international non-profit organization headquartered in Atlanta, Georgia, United States. The ISA serves the tree care industry as a paid membership association and a credentialing organization that promotes the professional practice of arboriculture. ISA focuses on providing research, technology, and education opportunities for tree care professionals to develop their arboricultural expertise. ISA also works to educate the general public about the benefits of trees and the need for proper tree care.

Worldwide, ISA has 22,000 members and 31,000 ISA-certified tree care professionals with 59 chapters, associate organizations, and professional affiliates throughout North America, Asia, Oceania, Europe, and South America.

== Credentials ==
ISA offers the following credentials:

- ISA Certified Arborist
- ISA Certified Arborist Utility Specialist (for those maintaining vegetation around electric utility wires)
- ISA Certified Arborist Municipal Specialist (for those with additional experience managing public urban trees)
- ISA Certified Tree Climber
- ISA Certified Tree Worker Aerial Lift Specialist
- ISA Board Certified Master Arborist
- ISA Tree Risk Assessment Qualification

== ISA Certified Arborist ==
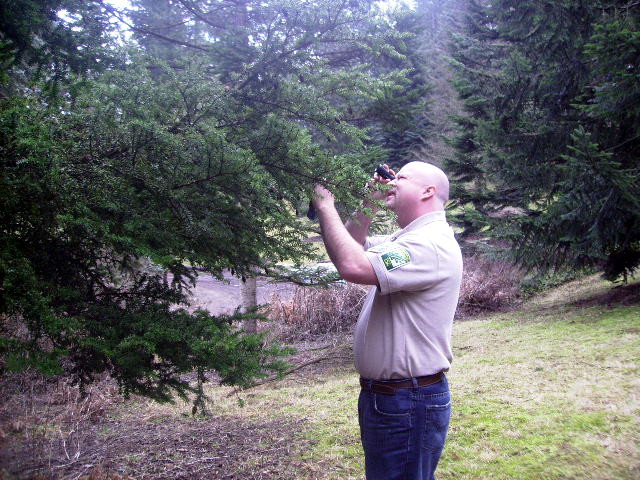
James Kinder, an ISA Certified Municipal Arborist, examining a Japanese hemlock at Hoyt Arboretum

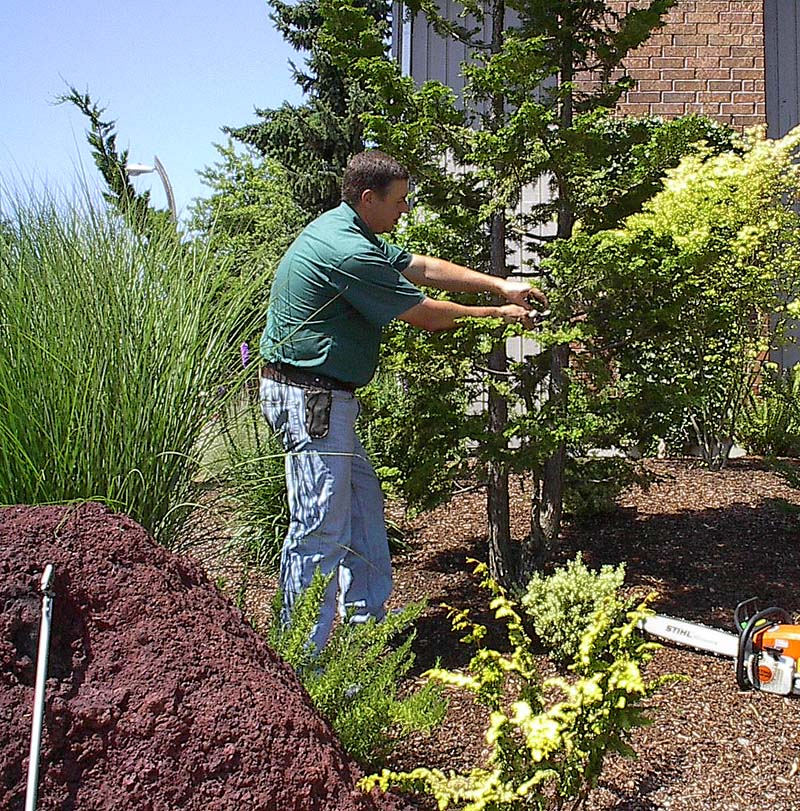
A Hinoki cypress receiving some corrective pruning by a certified arborist in Oregon

The Certified Arborist credential identifies professional arborists who have a minimum of three years' full-time experience working in the professional tree care industry and who have passed an examination covering facets of arboriculture. The Western Chapter of the ISA started the certification program in the 1980s, with the ISA initiating it in 1992.

== ISA Board Certified Master Arborist ==
The Board Certified Master Arborist (BCMA), or simply Master Arborist, credential recognizes professional arborists who have achieved the highest level of certification offered by the ISA and one of the top designations in the field. Candidates typically have been ISA Certified Arborists for three to five years before qualifying for the exam, depending on education and experience. The certification was created to distinguish the most advanced practitioners in arboriculture.

The Master Arborist examination is a far more extensive exam than the Certified Arborist Exam, and covers a broad scope of both aboriculture management, science and work practices. The exam includes the following areas:

- Science: Abiotic Influences; Biology; Biotic Influences; Diagnostic Process; Diagnostic Tools; Plant Identification and Selection; Soil Sciences
- Practice: Climbing, Rigging, and Removal; Installation; IPM; Water Management; Pruning; Soil Treatments; Soil & protection
- Management: Business Relations; Inventory and Management Plans; Plant Appraisal; Risk Assessment; Safety; Tree Preservation

Another credential that is on a par with the Master Arborist is that of the American Society of Consulting Arborists, the Registered Consulting Arborist. There are perhaps six hundred individuals with that qualification, and only 70 arborists who hold both credentials.
