= Arboriculture =

Management and study of trees and other woody plants

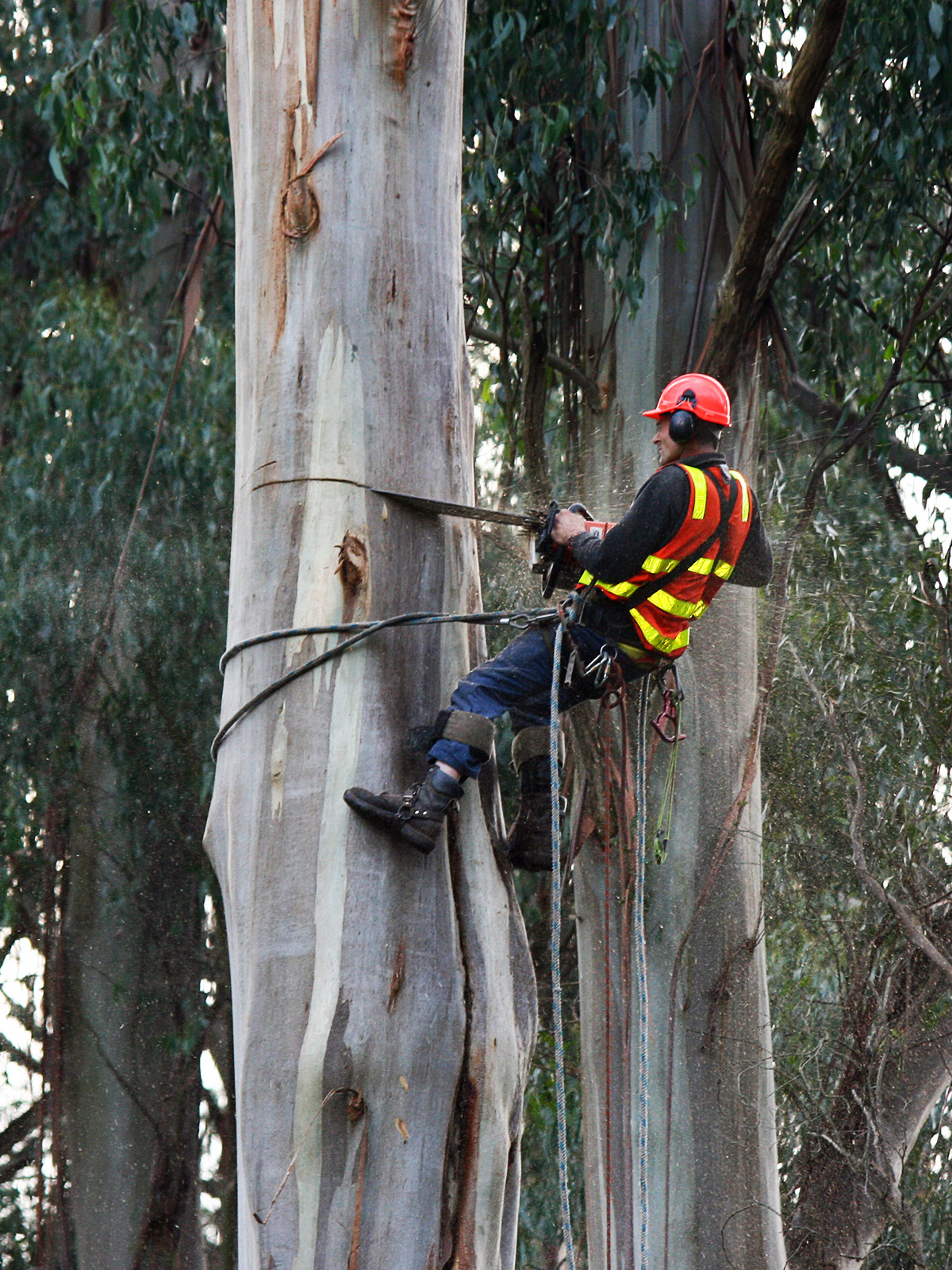
An arborist practicing tree care: using a chainsaw to fell a eucalyptus tree in a park at Kallista, Victoria.

Arboriculture (/ˈɑːrbərɪˌkʌltʃər, ɑːrˈbɔːr-/, from Latin: arboris + culture) is the cultivation, management, and study of individual trees, shrubs, vines, and other perennial woody plants. The science of arboriculture studies how these plants grow and respond to cultural practices and to their environment. The practice of arboriculture includes cultural techniques such as selection, planting, training, fertilization, pest and pathogen control, pruning, shaping, and removal.

A person who practices or studies arboriculture can be termed an arborist or an arboriculturist. A tree surgeon is more typically someone who is trained in the physical maintenance and manipulation of trees and therefore more a part of the arboriculture process rather than an arborist. Risk management, legal issues, and aesthetic considerations have come to play prominent roles in the practice of arboriculture. Businesses often need to hire arboriculturists to complete "tree hazard surveys" and generally manage the trees on-site to fulfill occupational safety and health obligations.

Arboriculture is primarily focused on individual woody plants and trees maintained for permanent landscape and amenity purposes, usually in gardens, parks or other populated settings, by arborists, for the enjoyment, protection, and benefit of people.

Arboricultural matters are also considered to be within the practice of urban forestry, yet the clear and separate divisions are not distinct or discreet.

== Tree benefits ==
Tree benefits are the economic, ecological, social and aesthetic use, function purpose, or services of a tree (or group of trees), in its situational context in the landscape.

=== Environmental benefits ===
- Erosion control and soil retention
- Improved water infiltration and percolation
- Protection from exposure: windbreak, shade, impact from hail/rainfall
- Air humidification
- Modulates environmental conditions in a given microclimate: shields wind, humidifies, provides shade
- Carbon sequestration and oxygen production

=== Ecological benefits ===
- Attracting pollinators
- Increased biodiversity
- Food for decomposers, consumers, and pollinators
- Soil health: organic matter accumulation from leaf litter and root exudates (symbiotic microbes)
- Ecological habitat

=== Socioeconomic benefits ===
- Increases employment: forestry, education, tourism
- Run-off and flood control (e.g. bioswales, plantings on slopes)
- Aesthetic beauty: parks, gatherings, social events, tourism, senses (fragrance, visual), focal point
- Adds character and prestige to the landscape, creating a "natural" feel
- Climate control (e.g shade): can reduce energy consumption of buildings
- Privacy and protection: from noise, wind
- Cultural benefits: eg. memorials for a loved one
- Medical benefits: eg. Taxus chemotherapy
- Materials: wood for building, paper pulp
- Fodder for livestock
- Property value: trees can increase by 10–20%
- Increases the amount of time customers will spend in a mall, strip mall, shopping district

== Tree defects ==
A tree defect is any feature, condition, or deformity of a tree that indicates weak structure or instability that could contribute to tree failure.

=== Common types of tree defects ===
==== Codominant stems ====
This is when two or more stems that grow upward from a single point of origin and compete with one another.

- common with decurrent growth habits
- occurs in excurrent trees only after the leader is killed and multiple leaders compete for dominance

==== Included bark ====
Bark is incorporated in the joint between two limbs, creating a weak attachment

- occurs in branch unions with a high attachment angle (i.e. v-shaped unions)
- common in many columnar/fastigiate growing deciduous trees

==== Dead, diseased, or broken branches ====
- woundwood cannot grow over stubs or dead branches to seal off decay
- symptoms/signs of disease: e.g. oozing through the bark, sunken areas in the bark, and bark with abnormal patterns or colours, stunted new growth, discolouration of the foliage

==== Cracks ====
- longitudinal cracks result from interior decay, bark rips/tears, or torsion from wind load
- transverse cracks result from buckled wood, often caused by unnatural loading on branches, such as lion's tailing.
- Seams: bark edges meet at a crack or wound
- Ribs: bulges, indicating interior cracks

==== Cavity and hollows ====
This is when sunken or open areas wherein a tree has suffered injury followed by decay. Further indications include: fungal fruiting structures, insect or animal nests.

==== Lean ====
A lean of more than 40% from vertical presents a risk of tree failure.

==== Taper ====
A taper is a change in diameter over the length of trunks branches and roots.

==== Epicormic branches ====
These are water sprouts in canopy or suckers from root system, and often grow in response to major damage or excessive pruning.

==== Roots ====
- girdling roots compress the trunk, leading to poor trunk taper, and restrict vascular flow
- kinked roots provide poor structural support; the kink is a site of potential root failure
- circling roots occurs when roots encounter obstructions/limitations such as a small tree well or being grown too long in a nursery pot; these cannot provide adequate structural support and are limited in accessing nutrients and water
- healthy soil texture and depth, drainage, water availability, makes for healthy roots

== Tree installation ==
Proper tree installation ensures the long-term viability of the tree and reduces the risk of tree failure.

Quality nursery stock must be used. There must be no visible damage or sign of disease. Ideally the tree should have good crown structure. A healthy root ball should not have circling roots and new fibrous roots should be present at the soil perimeter. Girdling or circling roots should be pruned out. Excess soil above the root flare should be removed immediately, since it presents a risk of disease ingress into the trunk.

Appropriate time of year to plant: generally fall or early spring in temperate regions of the northern hemisphere.

Planting hole: the planting hole should be 3 times the width of the root ball. The hole should be dug deep enough that when the root ball is placed on the substrate, the root flare is 3–5cm above the surrounding soil grade. If soil is left against the trunk, it may lead to bark, cambium and wood decay. Angular sides to the planting hole will encourage roots to grow radially from the trunk, rather than circling the planting hole. In urban settings, soil preparation may include the use of:

- Silva cells: suspended pavement over modular cells containing soil for root development
- Structural soils: growing medium composed of 80% crushed rock and 20% loam, which supports surface load without it leading to soil compaction

Tree wells: a zone of mulch can be installed around the tree trunk to: limit root zone competition (from turf or weeds), reduce soil compaction, improve soil structure, conserve moisture, and keep lawn equipment at a distance. No more than 5–10cm of mulch should be used to avoid suffocating the roots. Mulch must be kept approximately 20cm from the trunk to avoid burying the root flare. With city trees additional tree well preparation includes:

Tree grates/grill and frames: limit compaction on root zone and mechanical damage to roots and trunk

Root barriers: forces roots to grow down under surface asphalt/concrete/pavers to limit infrastructure damage from roots

Staking: newly planted, immature trees should be staked for one growing season to allow for the root system to establish. Staking for longer than one season should only be considered in situations where the root system has failed to establish sufficient structural support. Guy wires can be used for larger, newly planted trees. Care must be used to avoid stem girdling from the support system ties.

Irrigation: irrigation infrastructure may be installed to ensure a regular water supply throughout the lifetime of the tree. Wicking beds are an underground reservoir from which water is wicked into soil. Watering bags may be temporarily installed around tree stakes to provide water until the root system becomes established. Permeable paving allows for water infiltration in paved urban settings, such as parks and walkways.

== UK ==
Within the United Kingdom trees are considered as a material consideration within the town planning system and may be conserved as amenity landscape features.

The role of the Arborist or Local Government Arboricultural Officer is likely to have a great effect on such matters. Identification of trees of high quality which may have extensive longevity is a key element in the preservation of trees.

Urban and rural trees may benefit from statutory protection under the Town and Country Planning system. Such protection can result in the conservation and improvement of the urban forest as well as rural settlements.

Historically the profession divides into the operational and professional areas. These might be further subdivided into the private and public sectors. The profession is broadly considered as having one trade body known as the Arboricultural Association, although the Institute of Chartered Foresters offers a route for professional recognition and chartered arboriculturist status.

The qualifications associated with the industry range from vocational to Doctorate. Arboriculture is a comparatively young industry.

== See also ==
- Agroforestry
- Arborist
- Bonsai
- European Arboricultural Council
- Forester
- Forestry
- Fruit tree pruning
- Horticulture
- International Society of Arboriculture
- Landscape architecture
- Landscaping
- Silviculture
- Silvology
- Tree care
- Tree forks
- Tree shaping
- Tropical horticulture
- Urban forestry
- Viticulture
