= Urban reforestation =

Planting of trees in urban environments

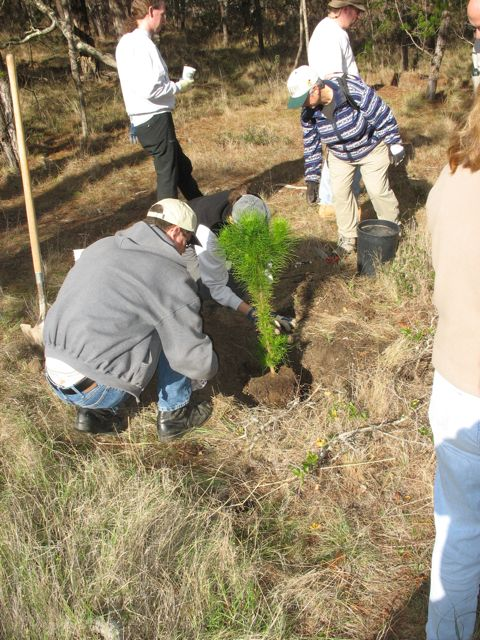
Reforestation in general is a common solution for groups to come together and find solutions for local and global issues.

Urban reforestation is the practice of planting trees, typically on a large scale, in urban environments. It may also include urban horticulture and urban farming.

== Benefits ==
Reasons for practicing urban reforestation include urban beautification; increasing shade; modifying the urban climate; improving air quality, such as by sequestering carbon dioxide; and restoration of urban forests after a natural disaster. Increased shade from urban reforestation can also lead to decreased energy costs, as heat from the sun is blocked from heating structures that use air conditioning. These benefits may aid in increasing local property values, filtering rainwater pollutants from the streets and thus improving water quality, and creating more habitats for wildlife, particularly endangered species.

Urban reforestation may also be effective because it does not require the purchase of a large piece of land to execute.

== Programs ==
=== Australia ===
The Urban Reforestation organization in Australia is a grassroots organization that focuses on sustainable living in urban areas.

=== France ===
The widespread reforestation in urban sites of Paris was launched in 2020 in order to reduce air pollution in the city. Anne Hidalgo, Mayor of Paris, stated that by the summer of 2023 63,500 trees were already planted, and by end of her term 170,000 will be planted in all.

=== Turkey ===
Istanbul Metropolitan Municipality began a green project that covers 78,500 m^{2} in Zeytinburnu to afforest the barren part of Zeytinburnu coast, and the urban reforestation project provided continuity of the coast line Yedikule to Bakırköy for pedestrians.

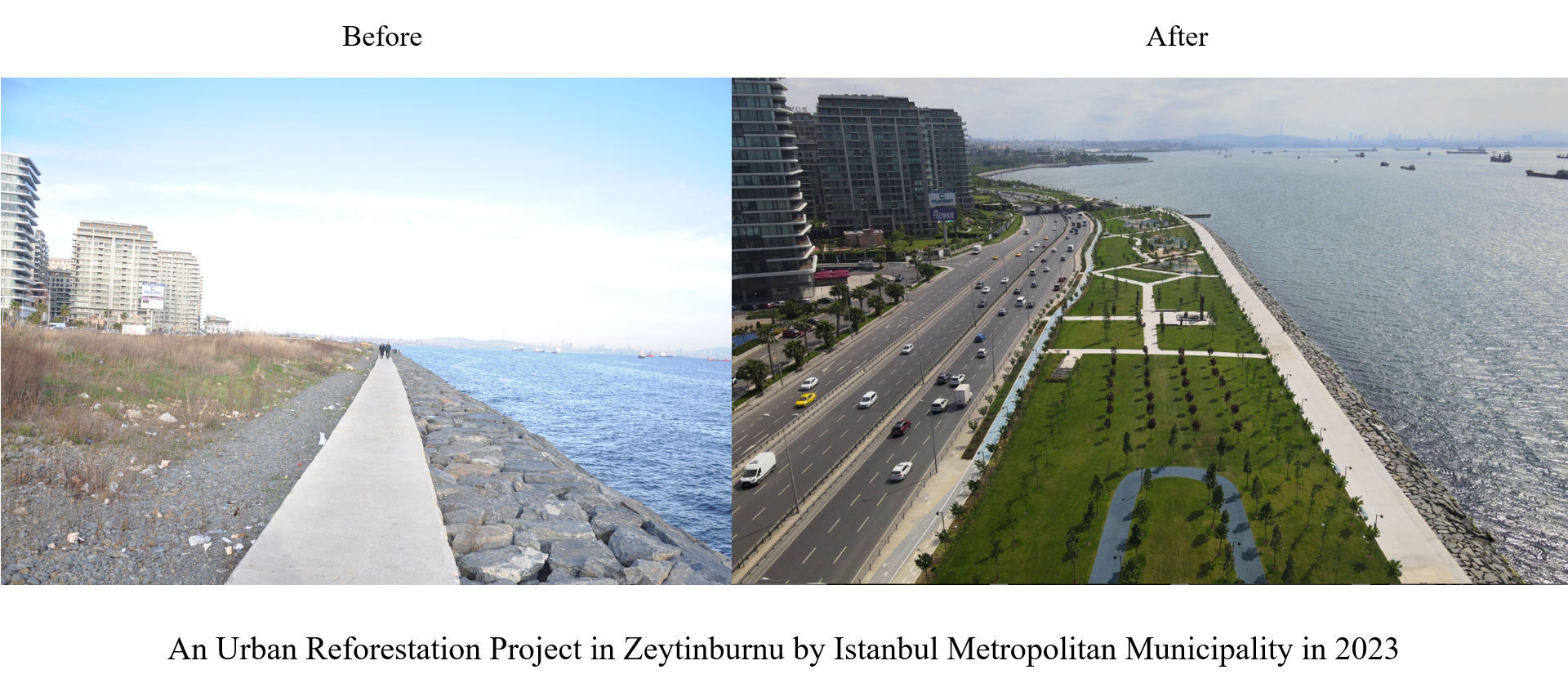
An urban reforestation in Zeytinburnu, Constantinople

=== United States ===
Large scale urban reforestation programs in the United States include New York City's Million Tree Initiative and TreePeople in Los Angeles, which planted 1 million trees in preparation for the 1984 Summer Olympics and continued planting thereafter. In 2022, Boston announced a new forestry division to grow the tree canopy within the city.

Grassroots efforts include Friends of the Urban Forest in San Francisco, which advocates for the planting of street trees.

In California, there are government funded programs such as the California Department of Forestry and Fire Protection's Urban Forestry Program. They advocate for local sustainability as well as health and happiness for the community long term. This Urban Forestry Program also seeks to aid disadvantaged and/or low-income communities.

== Climate change ==
Most cities have the potential to use urban reforestation as a means of combating climate change. Urban reforestation can also contribute to lowering energy consumption.

== Concerns ==
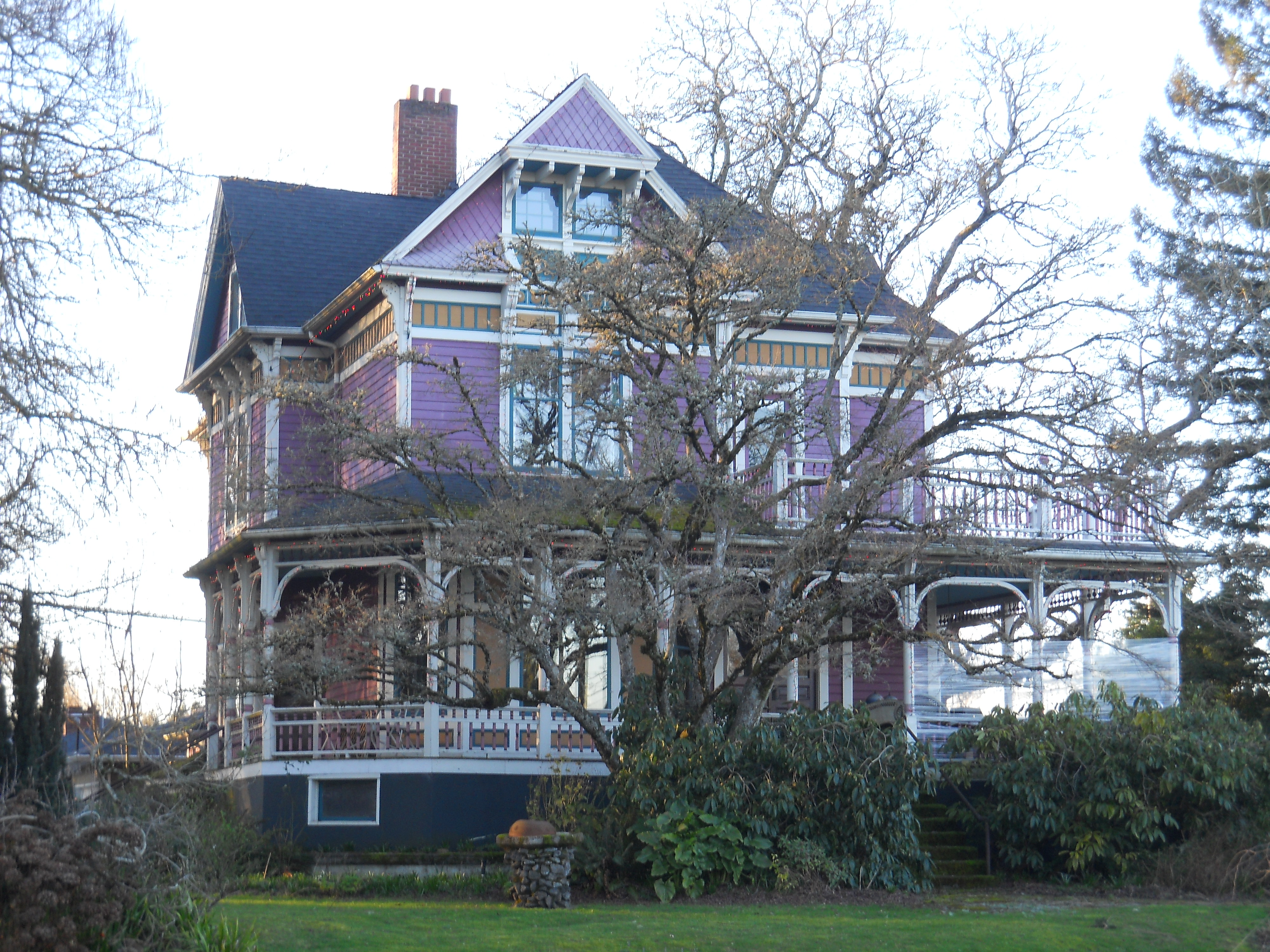
Trees planted in municipal areas are subject to removal as preferences change.

Urban reforestation efforts compete for money and urban land that could be used for other purposes. For example, effort placed in planting new trees can take away from maintenance of already established trees. Equity of where urban reforestation occurs may also be questioned. Programs such as California Department of Forestry and Fire Protection's Urban Forestry target these communities, but this is not always the case. Inequality in distribution of trees planted during Urban Reforestation leads to inequality of life. Permanence of trees is also an issue as a tree planted is a tree that might have to be removed in the future due to preferences of land owners in urban spaces.

Urban reforestation projects may also lack support in neighborhoods where environmentalist groups do not sufficiently involve residents in planning and decision-making, particularly when white environmentalists are conducting projects in communities of color, as noted in a 2014 report by environmental sociologist Dorceta Taylor from the University of Michigan. For example, from 2011 to 2014, a nonprofit organization named The Greening of Detroit planted thousands of new trees to restore Detroit's tree canopy. However, about a quarter of residents offered free trees in front of their homes submitted a "no tree request". Although they recognized the benefits of urban forestry, they didn't trust the organization staff, who were predominantly white and not from Detroit. They also felt that they didn't have enough say in what was being planted since they expected to be given responsibility for maintaining the trees planted in their neighborhoods, as previous reforestation project trees received inadequate care from the city and caused issues with appearance and safety. Residents were a lot more open to the idea of receiving free trees if they got to choose what was planted.

== See also ==
- Tree planting
- Forest restoration
- Rewilding
- Urban agriculture
- Urban forest inequity
- Urban green space
- Urban prairie
- Urban resilience
