= Tree Cities of the World =

Designation for cities committed to maintaining their urban forests

Tree Cities of the World is a worldwide program managed by the Food and Agriculture Organization of the United Nations (FAO) and the Arbor Day Foundation in the US, whereby municipalities of any size can apply to earn the designation "Tree City of the World".

== History ==
The program was launched at the first World Forum on Urban Forests held in October 2018 in Mantua, Italy, in 2018 by the FAO and Arbor Day Foundation. The aim is to celebrate and recognize cities and towns of all sizes throughout the world which have shown a commitment to maintaining their urban forests. From the end of 2019, any municipal government which has responsibility for its trees were able to apply to become a designated Tree City of the World. The goal shared by both organizations is "to foster a robust and diverse network of communities, practitioners, advocates, and scientists that will lead to sustainable urban forests across the globe".

The Tree City USA program began in 1976, co-sponsored by the National Association of State Foresters and the United States Forest Service, established a method by which the forest managers could be assisted in their work and recognized for it. However the importance of urban forests has been realized as even more vital in a time of global warming, pollution and crowded cities, adding to the well-being of residents and workers of villages, suburbs, towns and cities. As of 2025, there are almost 3,500 cities on the list of Tree Cities USA.

== Organisation ==
Five core standards are necessary to be met by a Tree City of the World:

- Establish responsibility for the trees.
- Set the rules – policies, best practices, or industry standards for management of the trees.
- Know what you have: create an inventory of all of the trees in the municipality.
- Allocate resources from the annual budget.
- Celebrate the achievements, to acknowledge those who do the work and to help raise awareness among the public of the importance of trees.

On 4 February 2020, 59 cities were announced as having achieved the designation of Tree City of the World. There were 27 in the United States, with the rest scattered across the world, from large cities such as New York City and San Francisco, European cities such as Milan, to smaller municipalities such as and the Adelaide suburb of Burnside in South Australia, and Queenstown in New Zealand. At that time, around 100 other cities had also pledged to participate in the next round. As of 2024, there are now 210 cities in 24 countries recognized as Tree Cities of the World.

== Partners ==
Six national non-profit organizations partner with the Arbor Day Foundation and FAO to support cities in meeting the five standards, applying for recognition, and networking with other Tree Cities to build national networks of municipalities committed to best practices in urban forestry. The official National Program Leads are:

- Trees for Cities, United Kingdom
- Reforestamos, Mexico and Latin America
- Treenet, Australia
- Arbocity, Spain
- Tree Canada, Canada
- Brazilian Society of Urban Forestry (SBAU), Brazil
- List of Tree Cities USA, United States

Applications are required to renewed annually for continuing recognition.

== See also ==
- European City of the Trees, an award given by the European Arboricultural Council
- List of Tree Cities USA, under the US programme established in 1976
- Million Tree Initiative, a commitment made by cities to plant a million trees
- Trees for Cities, a UK not-for-profit dedicated to planting trees in cities
- Nashville's Highland Rim Forest, largest urban forest within limits of any major city in the world
