= Urban forest inequity =

Inequitable distribution of trees

Urban forest inequity, also known as shade inequity or tree canopy inequity, is the inequitable distribution of trees, with their associated benefits, across metropolitan areas. Urban forest inequity is often seen as a form of environmental injustice because lower-income communities and marginalized groups commonly receive less of the social, environmental, and health benefits urban forests provide.

Urban forest inequity has a number of follow-on effects, including impacts on faunal biodiversity and the urban heat island effect. Urban heat inequity occurs when intra-urban heat islands, with their associated negative physical and emotional health consequences, are more common and more intense in lower-income communities. Researchers have found relation between urban forest inequity to historical and institutional factors, such as redlining and uneven public investment in green infrastructure. Some impacts of the higher exposure to urban heat island include illness related to high heat, poorer air quality, and reduced access to the mental and physical health benefits associated with green space.

Research on urban forest inequity started from late 20th century environmental justice and expanded to the 2000s with the use of GIS, remote sensing, and census-linked analysis. With these tools researchers have found demographic measures and data sources. Studies on spatial research influenced by urban forest inequity is global, as it includes case studies in North American, Asia, Africa, and Latin America. Proposed responses to this phenomenon include community engagement in large and big locations, initiatives to plant trees and how to maintain them, and planning strategies such as green belts. There is also debate among scholars about potential unintended consequences of greening intervention, such as green gentrification.

== Definitions ==
=== Urban forests ===
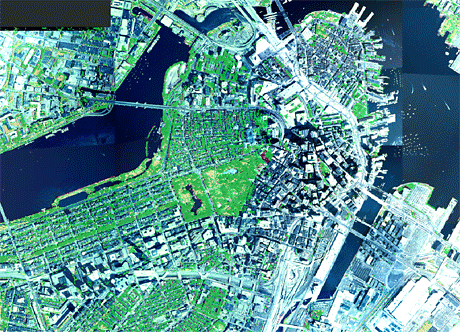
Satellite image of Boston showing variations in urban forestry across the city.

Urban forests are areas of land covered by trees or other vegetation located in and around places of intensive human influence, particularly metropolitan, urban areas such as cities. Urban forests, though present on both public and private land, typically are found on public spaces due to the predominance of street trees noted by researcher Steven Strom. Urban forests are recognized for their significant role in mitigating the impacts of climate change, exemplified by their role in mitigating heat and flood risks and their contribution to green infrastructure is seen as a nature-based solution for climate change adaptation and mitigation. Trees and vegetation absorb and store rainwater during heavy rainfall events, reducing flood risk, and capture carbon dioxide from the atmosphere as part of climate change mitigation efforts. Additionally, urban forests are also important in maintaining the biodiversity of an urban area, particularly the avifauna (birds) of the area. These characteristics of urban forests help contribute to the creation of healthy, resilient, and sustainable cities in a cost-effective manner.

=== Urban forest inequity ===
Urban forest inequity is a phenomenon in which the distribution and access to urban trees and green spaces. Municipalities across the United States believe that urban forest inequity is an example of environmental injustice, as it disproportionately impacts marginalized communities. Numerous studies, including a 2017 meta-analysis done by researchers Ed Gerrish and Shannon Lea Watkins, have found a positive relationship between income and urban forest coverage. This introduces the concept of the luxury effects, which explains how the disparities in urban forest cover coincide with socio-economic and historical factors. The luxury effect illustrates how wealthier areas tend to exhibit higher biodiversity, reflecting the influence of socioeconomic factors and education levels in shaping the quantity and quality of green spaces in a given area. Moreover, inequitable distribution of greenery in urban areas may restrict an equal distribution of the benefits of urban forests, which include some benefits like reducing stress and anxiety, cultivating a safe community, emotional fulfillment, mitigating the effects of global warming. For instance, canopy cover quantity in an area can diminish the urban heat island effect and increase carbon sequestration from the atmosphere. Various historical, cultural, and institutional factors contribute to the perceived inequities in urban forestry management and inequitable distribution of urban greenery. A 2022 paper published in the International Journal of Environmental Research and Public Health found that vulnerable residents of an urban area, particularly lower-income residents and those who live further from urban forests and green space, are particularly susceptible to the urban heat island effect. There are examples of urban forest inequity in cities globally, some of which are listed below.

== History ==
=== History of study ===
The study of urban forest inequity started from a broader body of environmental justice research in the late 20th century. Early environmental justice work focused on the disproportionate geography of environmental amenities and disamenities, including parks and places with pollution, and how these distributions were related to race, class, and other factors of socioeconomic status. Then worries of environmental injustice grew and so did the research interest in the spatial distribution of desirable urban resources like street trees.

Firsthand research into urban green space equity gained popularity in the 2000s, with scholars practicing research using statistical and spatial analysis tools, including remote sensing, census data place, and GIS, to examine how urban vegetation was distributed and how it related to demographic variables. This research found that in many North American cities, minority neighborhoods had less tree canopy cover and fewer green spaces than those neighborhoods with wealthier and higher status.

Research into the relationship of green spaces and demographic factors have produced mixed results. Several studies confirm a positive relationship between income and tree cover, but the association with race and ethnicity has been more mixed. Some examples are in the U.S cities, where studies in cities found that African-American or Hispanic neighborhoods had lower tree cover while others observed higher tree cover in some minority neighborhoods.

Recently, the field has expanded to include global perspectives distributed throughout the global South, in countries such as South Africa and China. Researchers have recorded some inconsistencies in urban green spaces among racial and income groups, sometimes shaped by a past of segregation or inequity.

Despite the growing number of studies, some scholars argue correlations do not always show reason of the cause, and that preferences, local policies, and even climatic factors were contributing factors to urban forest distribution patterns of sustainability. Some critics also say that future research should focus more on cooperative research directed at the processes that make inequity less over time.

=== History of impacts ===
The impacts of inequity in urban forests have been examined mainly on the basis of environmental, social, and health effects. Research has stated that areas with less canopy cover tend to have warmer temperatures, which would end up creating an urban heat island, poorer air quality, and even less access to mental and physical health opportunities of green spaces. These imbalances have been linked to higher exposure to heatwaves and higher rates of heat-related illness across vulnerable populations.

The urban forest distribution and well-being relationship is more varied. Previous research has concluded that the expansion of green space in poor areas can improve public health, social cohesion, and property values. On the other side, there is the potential that large sized urban greening may help to unintentionally facilitate ecological or "green" gentrification, drive up housing costs, and displace low-income individuals, thus replacing one form of inequality with another.

The removal or absence of trees in public spaces has been tied to hostile-public space design, impacting marginalized populations disproportionately. In 2022, in Lakewood, New Jersey, all the trees in public square were removed after unhoused individuals started using the shade, and further removals happened when those people relocated to nearby parking lots. Supporters of tree removal argue that altering the physical environment can help address and improve public safety, business concerns, or urban management problems. Raymond Coles, mayor of Lakewood, said that despite residents were avoiding the square and women felt insecure. Coles mentioned that reports of harassment and the misuse of public spaces, such ash as public defecation despite the availability of portable toilets. Opponents to this view say that such measures can be extreme and contribute to environmental injustice and worsen conditions for vulnerable populations in times of extreme weather changes. Reverend Steve Brigham criticizes the tree removals as an extreme measure and argued that there could be other measures, such as providing toilets and offering more services to address underlying needs.

There are debates about the most appropriate ways of handling inequity in urban forests. Some researchers promote "just green enough" interventions that can maximize equitable access to green space and minimize the threat of displacement that minorities face. Others argue that policy measures must address environmental and social justice concerns at the same time, warning that actions such as the additional planting of trees will do nothing to confront the imminent inequities if they are not accompanied by the solutions for broader trends in urbanization, land use, and government.

People that criticize the concentration on inequity have long responded by suggesting that forests cover in cities could simply reveal local tastes, market forces, or natural conditions, and warned against adopting the same solutions to different cities or areas. They also point out that inequity should be addressed with regard to potential unintended consequences, for example, greater employment costs to sustain or conflict for land use.

== Causes and patterns ==
Scholars in a variety of contexts have identified several causes of urban forest inequity. Practices that started years ago like redlining, discriminatory zoning, and "White Flight" have produced spatial divisions in cities where parks and green infrastructure can act as boundaries between racially and economically different status neighborhoods. In some cases, these "boundary parks" risk making spaces dysfunctional by physically separating communities but failing to provide equal value due to low use, poor maintenance, or perceived safety issues, like "green walls."

== Associated problems ==
=== Environmental and Spatial Justice ===
Environmental justice and spatial justice are two ideologies associated with the problems presented by urban forest inequity, and these ideologies seek to understand the disproportionate quality of life due to uneven environmental or spatial conditions and benefits. In a 2022 paper, socio-spatial inequalities specialist Bernard Bret and geographer Sophie Moreau described environmental justice and spatial justice as two concepts defined by an interconnectedness between geographical space and quality of life. The U.S. Environmental Protection Agency defines environment justice as the fair treatment of all people regardless of their race, color, national origin or income, but in their research, they that inequities are most often visible along the lines of socioeconomic inequity. For example, South Africa in times of apartheid racial segregation left lasting mark on the spatial distribution of public green space, with predominantly Black African, Colored and Indian neighborhoods continuing to have significantly less vegetation areas, less parks and greater exposure to pullutants tan areas inhabited by non marginalized people.

=== Public health implications ===
The uneven distribution of urban trees and vegetation has direct and indirect consequences for public health and equity. With green infrastructure, pollutants are filtered in air improving its quality, the heat stress is mitigated through shading and evapotranspiration, and physical health is promoted alongside mental well-being because infrastructure has accessible spaces for recreation and social interaction. Communities with limited canopy cover are often more exposed to dangerous air and water pollutants experience higher rates of heat-related illness, and have less opportunities for physical activity and interactions with people around them.

Researchers in South Africa in a 2018 report found correlations between an increased risk of cancer and chemical poisoning, as well as of respiratory diseases like asthma, are of a much greater likelihood in marginalized communities that are negatively affected by environmental and spatial injustice, because individuals there may be more often be at risk of exposure to dangerous pollutants in water or in the air.

=== Urban heat island effect ===
The U.S. E.P.A. defines the urban heat island effect as a phenomenon where urban areas experience higher temperatures than surrounding areas. Air temperature inside urban areas can be about 1–3 °C or 1–7 °F higher than rural or surrounding air temperatures, on average. This results from a variety of reasons, such as albedo on urban surfaces, anthropogenic heat released from buildings and vehicles, and reduced areas of evapotranspiration. Asphalt and concrete, surfaces that are more common in urban areas, have a lower albedo than surfaces such as trees, grass, or snow. In addition, evapotranspiration is a powerful cooling process, and the relatively reduced amount of greenery in urban areas compared to rural areas contributes to the urban heat island effect. Without urban forests, the cooling mechanisms of high albedo and evapotranspiration do not work to cool the geographic area. Additionally, the E.P.A. has found that lower-income communities and those of color are particularly susceptible to the phenomenon known as intra-urban heat islands, which is due, in part, to historical redlining. As urban forests help combat urban heat islands and intra-urban heat islands, redlining contributes to this instance of environmental injustice.

== Examples ==
Some cities have historically faced problems concerning urban forest inequity. They may have a disproportionate amount of green space in higher-income communities or face criticism from those who advocate for environmental justice. Beijing, China is one of those examples, demonstrated by the lack of accessibility to green spaces compared to gated communities. Research was published in the journal Environment and Planning B: Urban and City Analytics with data from the Beijing Green Spaces System Planning which found that higher-income gated communities had more access to green spaces than lower-income residential communities and that the urban planning was not meeting the demand for public parks and playgrounds in the densely populated regions of the city.

New York City is another example of a city that has historically faced challenges with urban forest inequity. Because of the urban heat island effect, concrete in the city draws more heat and raises temperatures, so more shade coverage is needed to protect inhabitants. A 2023 editorial written for the New York Daily News found that many neighborhoods in the city lack shade protection and may subsequently face temperatures "20 to 45 degrees hotter than those with more shade," and these are typically lower-income communities. Moreover, researchers have often cited Chicago as another U.S. city facing difficulties in mitigating urban forest inequity. The city is actively trying to combat the lack of greenery and pollution they are facing through planting trees across different neighborhoods.

In 2021, a paper published in the International Journal of Environmental Research and Public Health worked to identify which regions in Delhi, India were experiencing high levels of urban heat, and consequently if they had sufficient green space or areas with urban forestry of some kind. According to the researchers, the results "documented how the spatial distribution of heat and greenspace relates to the spatial distribution of social vulnerability at the ward level in Delhi." Rafael Fernandez-Alvarez of Arizona State University conducted similar research on Mexico City, Mexico pertaining to the distribution of green public spaces for inhabitants. The researchers found that these spaces are often biased against marginalized populations. The evidence showed that they mostly exist in the wealthy areas of the capital city, while the more populated lower-income communities lacked green public spaces.

== Potential solutions ==
Efforts to address urban forest inequity must effectively combat both environmental and spatial injustice in addition to urban heat islands. Some people argue this may include activists and policymakers engaging directly with marginalized communities, public investment in underserved neighborhoods, and tighter government restrictions regarding land use and pollution concerns.

=== Community engagement ===
A 2023 article published in the National League of Cities offered several potential solutions to combat urban heat islands, which included but are not limited to: increasing green space by planting trees along streets or sidewalks, converting existing roof spaces to green roofs, replacing normal pavement with sustainable alternatives, subsidies for planting trees, and active engagement of low-income communities, among others.

=== Tree planting ===
A potential solution to address this issue is the implementation of tree-planting initiatives. These initiatives aim to provide resources and support to historically underserved areas, thereby contributing to a more equitable urban environment. However, it is important to recognize that simply planting trees in low canopy-covered areas may not be sufficient to combat this environmental inequity. Initiatives must adhere to specific practices aligned with urban forest management objectives to ensure the creation of an equitable urban environment.

Moreover, it is important to consider the potential impacts of tree-planting initiatives before their implementation, as they may unintentionally contribute to environmental gentrification. Studies have shown that within a 10-meter buffer of the newly planted street trees, properties tend to experience a notable increase in value, indicating a positive correlation between planting street trees and property values. However, it is worth noting that the rise in property values may not always translate to benefits for underserved communities. To counter eco-gentrification, there are some key practices for tree-planting initiatives to follow, which are described by Sousa-Silva et al. (2023) and Haffner (2015), including integrating initiatives with long-term management strategies, creating community engagement, and introducing changes gradually.

=== Green belt implementation ===
Green belt polices have been proposed as one means to address issues on access to urban green space, vegetation, and tree canopy. In arid and semi-arid regions green belts can work both to limit urban sprawl and to protect ecologically valuable landscapes and create new areas of recreation and green infrastructure for underrepresented communities. One example is the research in Hermosillo, Mexico, that explored how the integration of green belts with soil reconditioning and stormwater management parks provide ecosystem services and expand public space. The authors also mentioned that successful implementation requires engagement with local residents and developers, as well as measures against gentrification and market that creates pressure on land value.

Other broader studies on "green apartheid" in South Africa have documented sustained inequalities in the green infrastructure across racial and income groups and suggested that urban planning systems, including the required use of green belts, could help reduce such spatial inequalities. Studies of urban green space in the United States and China also emphasized environmental justice concerns, warning that large‑scale greening projects, if poorly regulated, may produce contradictory effects such as "green gentrification" that displace the intended beneficiaries.

=== MillionTreesNYC ===
An example of a tree-planting initiative that is currently ongoing is the Million Tree Initiative. New York City is an example of a city who implemented this initiative in recent years. The city launched the MillionTreesNYC initiative in 2007, which is now recognized as one of the largest and greatest-funded tree-planting initiatives in the United States. This initiative was a collaboration between the New York City Parks Department and the NY Restoration Project (NYPR), resulting in the successful planting of one million trees across five boroughs of New York City in less than a decade. Guided by considerations of health and socioeconomic factors, the initiative targeted neighbourhoods with the greatest lack of trees, aiming to improve urban canopy coverage by 20%. NYPR, a local non-profit organization, actively engaged the community in the planting and maintenance of the newly planted trees. This initiative was supported by collaborations with external partners and had help from volunteers around the city. After the initiative successfully planted one million trees across five boroughs, plans were made to update the street tree census and offer a user-friendly public map of trees to increase community involvement and create a culture of tree stewardship. MillionTreesNYC serves as a notable example of effectively increasing canopy cover in historically underserved areas, inspiring similar efforts in other cities, including Los Angeles.

== See also ==
- Environmental justice
- Million Tree Initiative
- Redlining
- Right to a healthy environment
- Spatial justice
- U.S. Environmental Protection Agency
- Urban ecology
- Urban forest
- Urban heat island
- Urban reforestation
