= FUF =

FUF may refer to:

- SV Falkensee-Finkenkrug, a German football club (named FuF 1970s–1990)
- Uruguayan Football Federation (Spanish: Federación Uruguaya de Football; 1923–1925)
- Freedom and Unity Front, a Ugandan political party (formed 2013)
- Friends of the Urban Forest, an American environmental group (formed 1981)
- Pular language, spoken in West Africa (ISO 636-3:fuf)
