= TreePeople =

US non-profit organization

- TreePeople logo
- Nickname: TP
- Founded: 1973
- Founder: Andy Lipkis
- Purpose: Conservation service, environmental education
- Location: Los Angeles, California, United States
- Region served: Los Angeles
- Website: www.treepeople.org

TreePeople is an educational and training environmental advocacy organization based in Los Angeles, California. The TreePeople organization advocates and works to support sustainable urban ecosystems in the Greater Los Angeles area through education, volunteer community-based action, and advocacy.

== Organization history ==
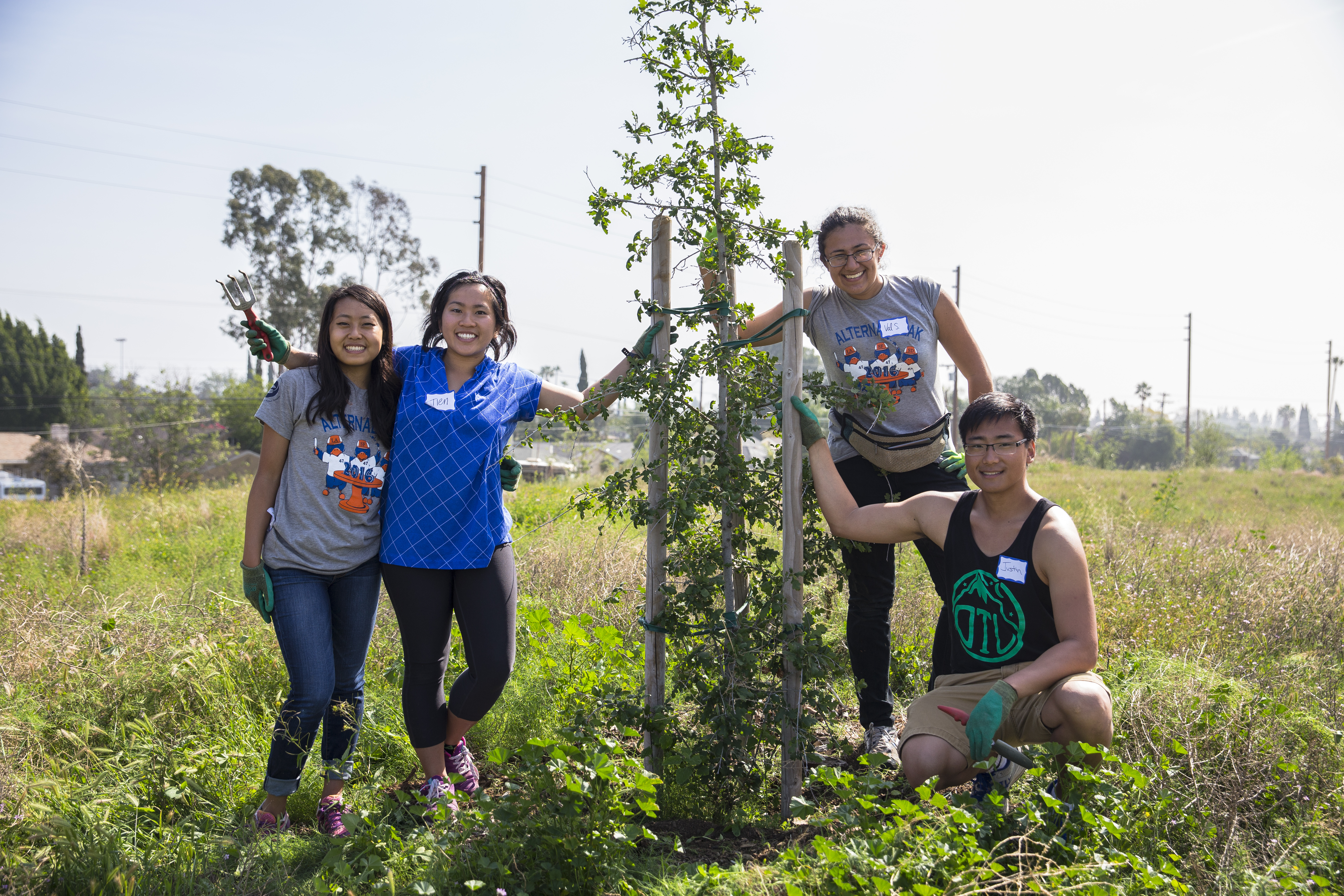
Tree planting event, Sheldon Arleta Park, Los Angeles

TreePeople was founded in Los Angeles in 1973 by an 18-year-old activist Andy Lipkis. Lipkis and a group of other teenagers began planting trees three years prior at summer camp in the San Bernardino Mountains. Lipkis heard that smog from Los Angeles was drifting up to the mountains and killing the forest. He rallied his fellow campers, tore up a parking lot, and planted smog-tolerant trees.

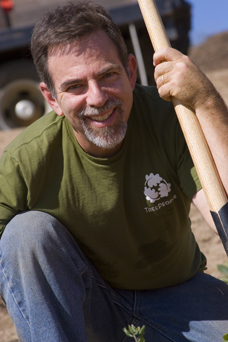
Andy Lipkis – Founder/President of TreePeople since 1973

Lipkis served as president of TreePeople for many years and still serves as a Board Member. Cindy Montañez became the Chief Executive Officer in 2016. The organization works with thousands of members and volunteers and more than 50 staff members, operating out of the Center for Community Forestry located with-in 45-acre Coldwater Canyon Park.

The TreePeople organization focuses on increasing Greater Los Angeles' urban forest by supporting people in planting and caring for trees at homes, on school yards, and in neighborhoods. It also supports volunteers in restoring damaged local forest ecosystems in the Santa Monica Mountains, San Gabriel Mountains and San Bernardino Mountains.

Beyond planting and caring for trees, TreePeople works to promote urban watershed management, using green infrastructure to address critical urban water issues. It educates and advocates for water conservation and stormwater capture in the urban landscape for Los Angeles' long-term sustainability.

Since its founding, the TreePeople staff have gone on to plant more than two million trees in the Los Angeles area and have developed one of the nation's largest environmental education programs. A recent program is T.R.E.E.S. – Transagency Resources for Environmental and Economic Sustainability – demonstrating the feasibility and facilitates the implementation of integrated urban ecosystem management to increase the health and sustainability of our cities.

== Accomplishments ==
- 1973 – The first Los Angeles Times article, "Andy vs. the Bureaucratic Deadwood", appears in April with a public request for four thousand dollars to fund what is to be the first TreePeople activity (although no formal organization exists at this time), a summer tree-planting program of 8,000 trees in the San Bernardino National Forest. By summer, $10,000 is raised. The California Conservation Project (CCP) is created as a nonprofit corporation to handle the money needed to do the tree planting.
- 1974 – Year Two begins with a goal of 10,000 trees potted during the week of Arbor Day. Agencies involved include the California Division of Forestry, California Air National Guard, U.S. Forest Service, Los Angeles Urban Forest Council, L.A. Bicentennial Committee, Southern California Edison (SCE), Camp JCA, ACTION (Peace Corps/VISTA), and numerous civic groups and schools. The public unofficially renames the California Conservation Project "the tree people".

Coldwater Canyon Park entrance

- 1976 – The Los Angeles City Recreation & Parks Department grants TreePeople a conditional-use permit of its Mountain Fire Station 108 (which eventually became Coldwater Canyon Park) for developing a small-scale nursery to grow seedlings. The Atlantic Richfield Company (ARCO) donates a 1950s vintage fuel truck, which becomes TreePeople's water truck.
- 1978 – Severe rains and local flooding give TreePeople its first experience in mobilizing volunteers for disaster-relief work, resulting in the headquarters being designated L.A.'s Emergency Resource Center.
- 1979 – In March, TreePeople closes the Marina Freeway for a Tree Run. The closure, a first for an L.A. freeway, attracts 5,000 runners and makes California transportation history by requiring special legislation in Culver City, Los Angeles County, and the California State Legislature.
- 1980 – In February, 3,000 volunteers (responding to 1,200 calls for help) are mobilized to assist local homeowners in volunteer-organized emergency-relief effort during excessive rains and flooding. Andy Lipkis appears on The Tonight Show, and Johnny Carson makes a personal contribution to replace shovels lost during the relief work. On the tenth anniversary of Earth Day, 2,000 people attend a celebration at the TreePeople headquarters.
- 1981-1984 – Persuaded Los Angeles residents to plant one million trees in time for the Olympics. The millionth tree is planted in the San Fernando Valley, four days before the Olympic torch is lit. To celebrate, staff and volunteers go to the mountains and plant 7,000 seedlings in one day.
- 1986 – Coordinated volunteers to rescue thousands of waterlogged books from the Los Angeles Central Library.
- 1986 – Planted 6,000 bare root fruit trees in Africa.
- 1987 – To help L.A. prepare for its goal of creating citywide mandatory recycling within three years, TreePeople develops a recycling component for its curriculum. During the school year that follows, 60,000 children—double the number stated in the contract—go through the program.
- 1990 – Organized 3,000 volunteers to plant nearly 400 trees along the Martin Luther King Boulevard in one day. The Simple Act of Planting a Tree, by Andy and Katie Lipkis, is published.
- 1998 – Andy Lipkis is honored as Founder of the Year at National Philanthropy Day.
- 1999 – Second Nature, a guide to adapting LA's Landscape for sustainable living is published by TreePeople.
- 2002 – TreePeople is among only 15 agencies worldwide to be honored by the Salt Lake City 2002 Olympic Committee, receiving the Spirit of the Land Environmental Education Award.
- 2003 – The Sun Valley Watershed Project was highlighted in the United Nations World Forestry Organization's State of the World's Forests 2003 as an example of partnering to create a sustainable water supply.
- 2004 – TreePeople completes construction on one of Los Angeles' most sustainable buildings – the Center for Community Forestry Conference Center. Designed by Marmol Radziner + Associates, this building had been a vision of Lipkis's for over a decade and includes a 220,000-gallon cistern to capture, clean and re-use rainwater.
- 2006 – TreePeople committed to helping the City of Los Angeles plant 300,000 trees in parklands to support Mayor Villaraigosa's Million Trees LA initiative. This work will include restoring the fire-damaged Griffith Park. TreePeople is currently working with Los Angeles Mayor Antonio Villaraigosa on his Million Trees LA initiative.
- 2007 – In the summer of 2007 Lipkis served as special advisor to Mayor of Los Angeles' climate change study. In August, 2007 Lipkis was featured in the Leonardo DiCaprio documentary, The 11th Hour, about the environmental crises caused by human actions and their impact on the planet. Also within the year, TreePeople was recognized in Edens Lost & Found, a nationally broadcast PBS program which highlighted the sustainability work of four U.S. cities.
- As of 2011, the organization had planted over 2 million trees in the Los Angeles area.
