= Urban forest =

Collection of trees within a city, town or a suburb

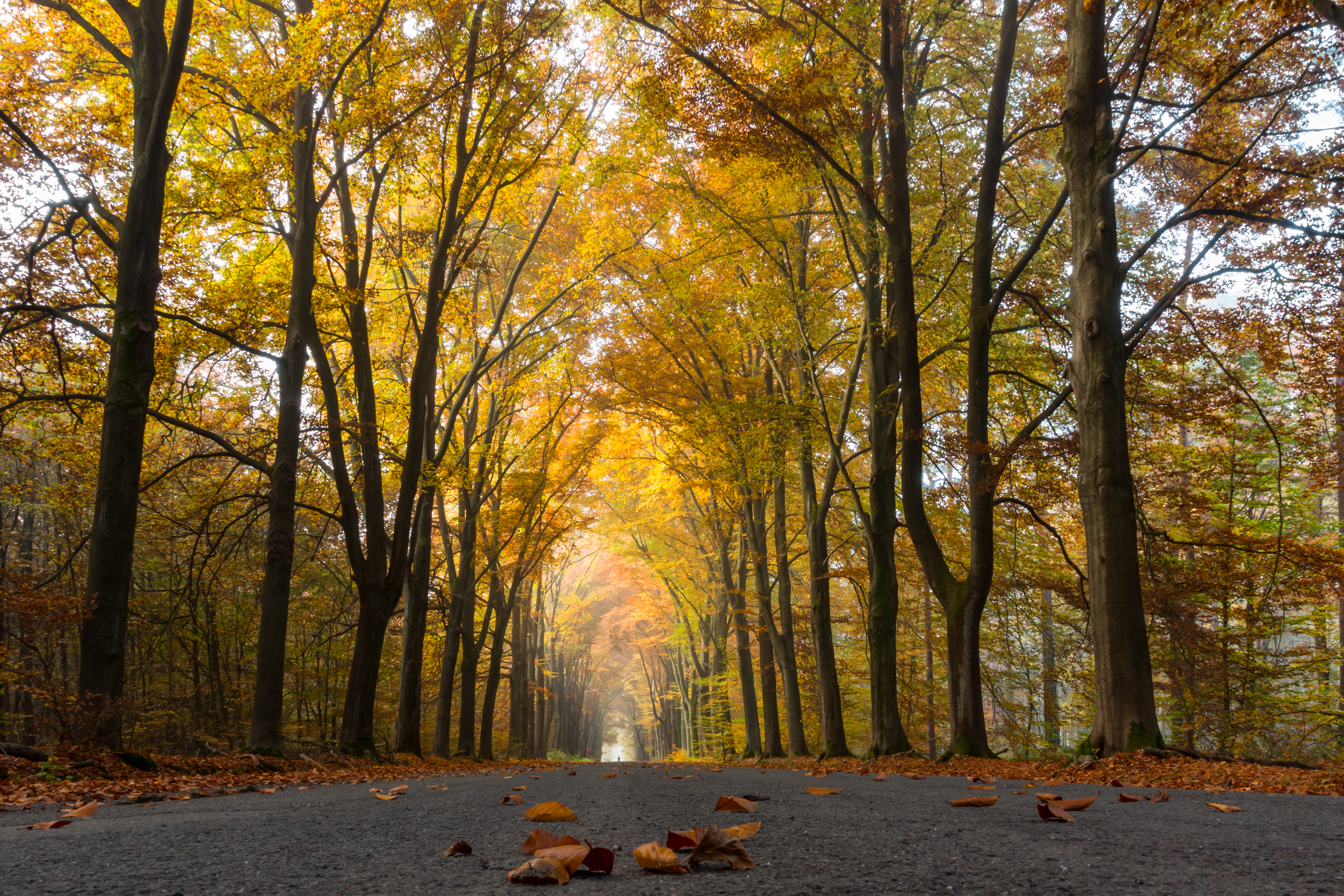
An allée of trees, in North Rhine-Westphalia, Germany, an example of so-called "kissing canopies", when the canopies of street trees reach all the way over a road and thus provide dappled shade along the entire route.

An urban forest is a forest, or a grove of trees, that grows within a city, town or a suburb. In a wider sense, it may include any kind of woody plant vegetation growing in and around human settlements. In urban areas, sections of urban forest and remnant bushland are sometimes fenced or otherwise restricted to protect regenerating vegetation, reduce human disturbance to sensitive habitats, and manage safety risks associated with drainage infrastructure or uneven terrain.

As opposed to a forest park, whose ecosystems are also inherited from wilderness leftovers, urban forests often lack amenities like public bathrooms, paved paths, or sometimes clear borders which are distinct features of parks. Care and management of urban forests is called urban forestry. Urban forests can be privately and publicly owned. Some municipal forests may be located outside of the town or city to which they belong.

== Examples ==
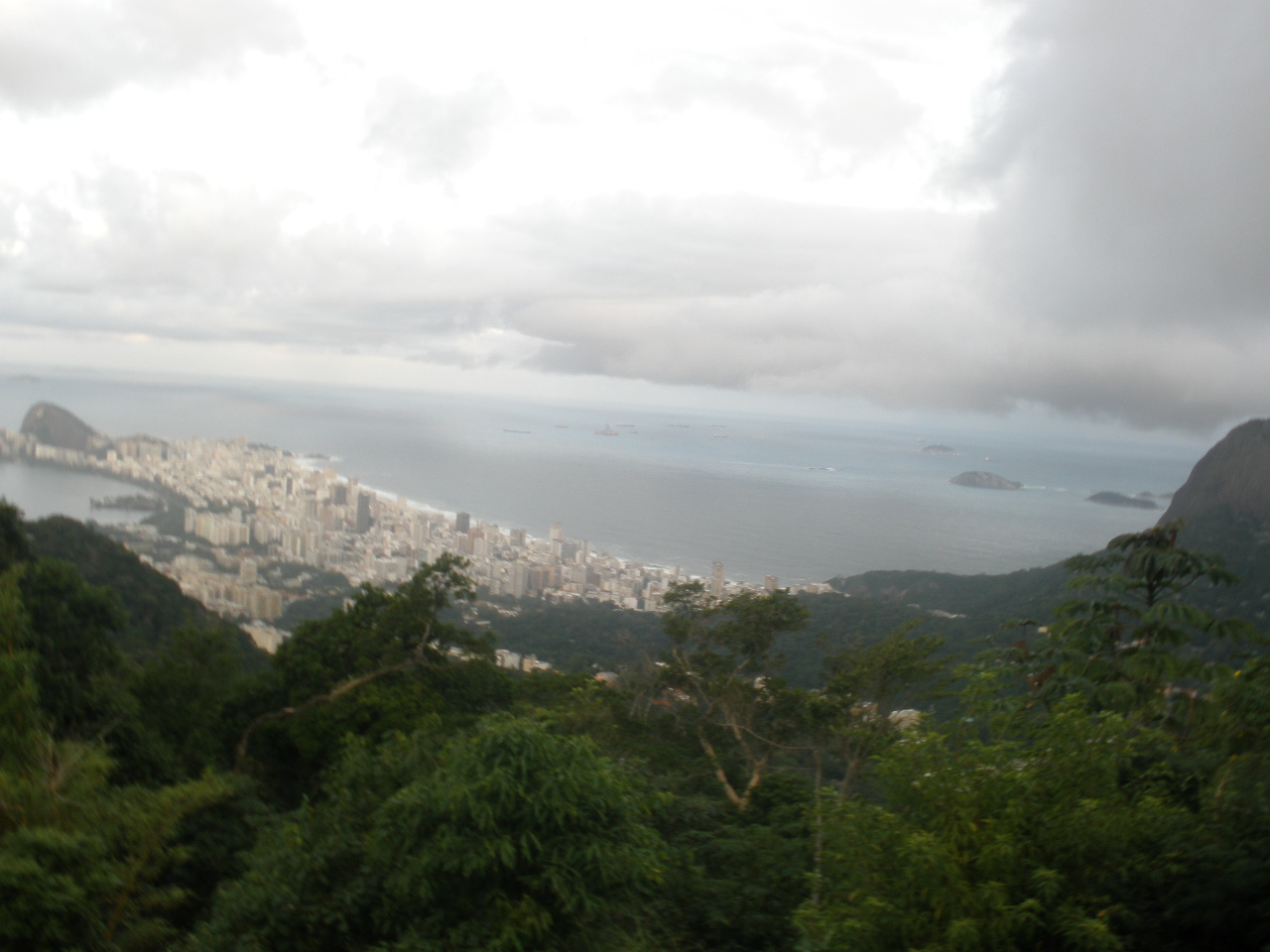
Tijuca Forest in Rio de Janeiro, Brazil

In many countries there is a growing understanding of the importance of the natural ecology in urban forests. There are numerous projects underway aimed at restoration and preservation of ecosystems, ranging from simple elimination of leaf-raking and elimination of invasive plants to full-blown reintroduction of original species and riparian ecosystems.

Some sources claim that the largest man-made urban forest in the world is located in Johannesburg in South Africa. The city is located in the highveld, a grassland biome typically lacking large numbers of trees, yet Johannesburg is still a very densely wooded city with reportedly 10 million artificially introduced trees and is rated as the city with the eighth highest tree coverage in the world.

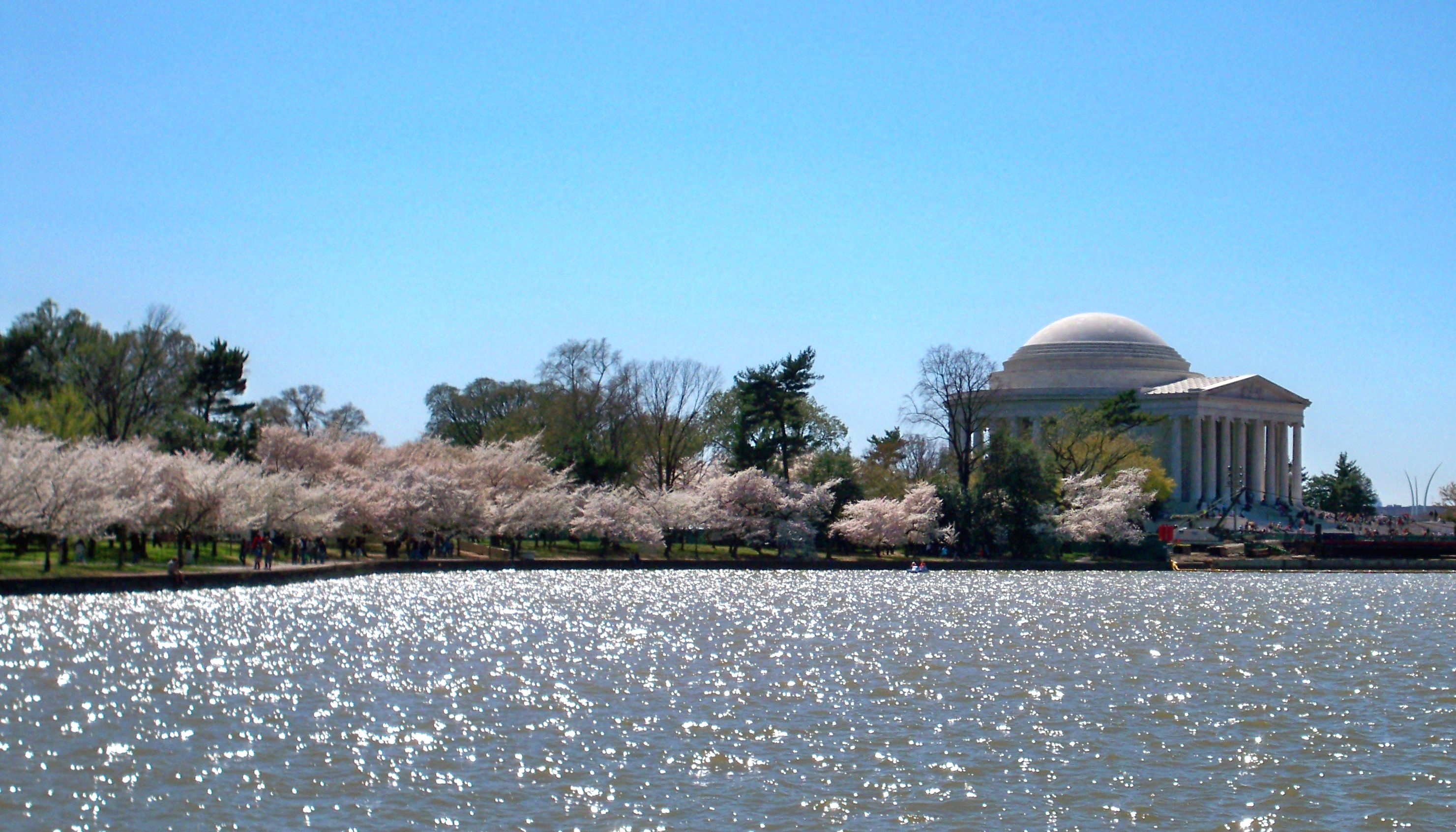
Cherry Blossoms lining the Tidal Basin in Washington, D.C.

Rio de Janeiro is also home to two of the vastest urban forests in the world, one of which is considered by some sources to be the largest one. Tijuca Forest is the most famous. It began as a restoration policy in 1844 to conserve the natural remnants of forest and replant in areas previously cleared for sugar and coffee. Despite the worldwide recognition of Tijuca Forest, another forest in the same city encompasses roughly three times the size of its more prominent neighbor: Pedra Branca State Park occupies 12,500 hectares (30,888 acres) of city land, against Tijuca's 3,953 hectares (9,768 acres). The larger metropolitan area encircles the forests which moderate the humid climate and provide sources of recreation for urban dwellers. Along with seven other smaller full protection conservation units in the city, they form an extensive natural area that contains the Transcarioca Trail, a 180-km footpath.

Sanjay Gandhi National Park in Mumbai, Maharashtra, India is also an example of an urban forest. It covers roughly around 20% area of the city. The forest is filled with many animals freely roaming around. It also has an important cultural site of ancient history situated in it known as the Kanheri caves. Nebraska National Forest is the largest man-made forest in the United States located in the state of Nebraska. It lies in several counties within the state and is a popular destination for campers year-round.

Several cities within the United States have also taken initiative investing in their urban forests to improve the well-being and economies of their communities. Some notable cities among them are Austin, Atlanta, Nashville, New York, Seattle, and Washington, D.C. New York, for example, has taken initiative to combat climate change by planting millions of trees around the city. In Austin, private companies are funding tree-planting campaigns for environmental and energy-saving purposes.

Nashville has an organization known as the Alliance to Conserve Nashville's Highland Rim Forest serving as a catalyst to pool action from across numerous conservation nonprofits that include the Cumberland River Compact, Friends of Beaman Park, and the Tennessee Environmental Council. Nashville contains the largest urban forest within the city limits of any city in the world with a population exceeding 500,000.

== Environmental impact ==
Urban forests play an important role in benefitting the environmental conditions of their respective cities. They moderate local climate, slowing wind and stormwater, and filter air and sunlight. They are critical in cooling the urban heat island effect, thus potentially reducing the number of unhealthful ozone days that plague major cities in peak summer months.

=== Air pollution reduction ===
As cities struggle to comply with air quality standards, trees can help to clean the air. The most serious pollutants in the urban atmosphere are ozone, nitrogen oxides (NOx), sulfuric oxides (SOx) and particulate pollution. Ground-level ozone, or smog, is created by chemical reactions between NOx and volatile organic compounds (VOCs) in the presence of sunlight. High temperatures increase the rate of this reaction. Vehicle emissions (especially diesel), and emissions from industrial facilities are the major sources of NOx. Vehicle emissions, industrial emissions, gasoline vapors, chemical solvents, trees and other plants are the major sources of VOCs. Particulate pollution, or particulate matter (PM_{10} and PM_{25}), is made up of microscopic solids or liquid droplets that can be inhaled and retained in lung tissue causing serious health problems. Most particulate pollution begins as smoke or diesel soot and can cause serious health risk to people with heart and lung diseases and irritation to healthy citizens. Trees are an important, cost-effective solution to reducing pollution and improving air quality.

Trees reduce temperatures and smog

With an extensive and healthy urban forest air quality can be drastically improved. Trees help to lower air temperatures and the urban heat island effect in urban areas. This reduction of temperature not only lowers energy use, it also improves air quality, as the formation of ozone is dependent on temperature. Trees reduce temperature not only by directly shading: when there is a large number of trees it create a difference in temperatures between the area when they are located and the neighbor area. This creates a difference in atmospheric pressure between the two areas, which creates wind. This phenomenon is called urban breeze cycle if the forest is near the city and park breeze cycle if the forest is in the city. That wind helps to lower temperature in the city.

- As temperatures climb, the formation of ozone increases.
- Healthy urban forests decrease temperatures, and reduce the formation of ozone.
- Large shade trees can reduce local ambient temperatures by 3 to 5 °C
- Maximum mid-day temperature reductions due to trees range from 0.04 °C to 0.2 °C per 1% canopy cover increase.
- In Sacramento County, California, it was estimated that doubling the canopy cover to five million trees would reduce summer temperatures by 3 degrees. This reduction in temperature would reduce peak ozone levels by as much as 7% and smoggy days by 50%.

Lower temperatures reduce emissions in parking lots

Temperature reduction from shade trees in parking lots lowers the amount of evaporative emissions from parked cars. Unshaded parking lots can be viewed as miniature heat islands, where temperatures can be even higher than surrounding areas. Tree canopies will reduce air temperatures significantly. Although the bulk of hydrocarbon emissions come from tailpipe exhaust, 16% of hydrocarbon emissions are from evaporative emissions that occur when the fuel delivery systems of parked vehicles are heated. These evaporative emissions and the exhaust emissions of the first few minutes of engine operation are sensitive to local microclimate. If cars are shaded in parking lots, evaporative emissions from fuel and volatilized plastics will be greatly reduced.

- Cars parked in parking lots with 50% canopy cover emit 8% less through evaporative emissions than cars parked in parking lots with only 8% canopy cover.
- Due to the positive effects trees have on reducing temperatures and evaporative emissions in parking lots, cities like Davis, California, have established parking lot ordinances that mandate 50% canopy cover over paved areas.
- "Cold Start" emissions

The volatile components of asphalt pavement evaporate more slowly in shaded parking lots and streets. The shade not only reduces emissions, but reduces shrinking and cracking so that maintenance intervals can be lengthened. Less maintenance means less hot asphalt (fumes) and less heavy equipment (exhaust). The same principle applies to asphalt-based roofing.

Active pollutant removal

Trees also reduce pollution by actively removing it from the atmosphere. Leaf stomata, the pores on the leaf surface, take in polluting gases which are then absorbed by water inside the leaf. Some species of trees are more susceptible to the uptake of pollution, which can negatively affect plant growth. Ideally, trees should be selected that take in higher quantities of polluting gases and are resistant to the negative effects they can cause.

A study across the Chicago region determined that trees removed approximately 17 tonnes of carbon monoxide (CO), 93 tonnes of sulfur dioxide (SO_{2}), 98 tonnes of nitrogen dioxide (NO_{2}), and 210 tonnes of ozone (O_{3}) in 1991.

Carbon sequestration

Urban forest managers are sometimes interested in the amount of carbon removed from the air and stored in their forest as wood in relation to the amount of carbon dioxide released into the atmosphere while running tree maintenance equipment powered by fossil fuels.

Interception of particulate matter

In addition to the uptake of harmful gases, trees act as filters intercepting airborne particles and reducing the amount of harmful particulate matter. The particles are captured by the surface area of the tree and its foliage. These particles temporarily rest on the surface of the tree, as they can be washed off by rainwater, blown off by high winds, or fall to the ground with a dropped leaf. Although trees are only a temporary host to particulate matter, if they did not exist, the temporarily housed particulate matter would remain airborne and harmful to humans. Increased tree cover will increase the amount of particulate matter intercepted from the air.

- Large evergreen trees with dense foliage collect the most particulate matter.
- The Chicago study determined that trees removed approximately 234 tonnes of particulate matter less than 10 micrometres (PM_{10}) in 1991.
- Large healthy trees greater than 75 cm in trunk diameter remove approximately 70 times more air pollution annually (1.4 kg/yr) than small healthy trees less than 10 cm in diameter (0.02 kg/yr).

=== Rainwater runoff reduction ===
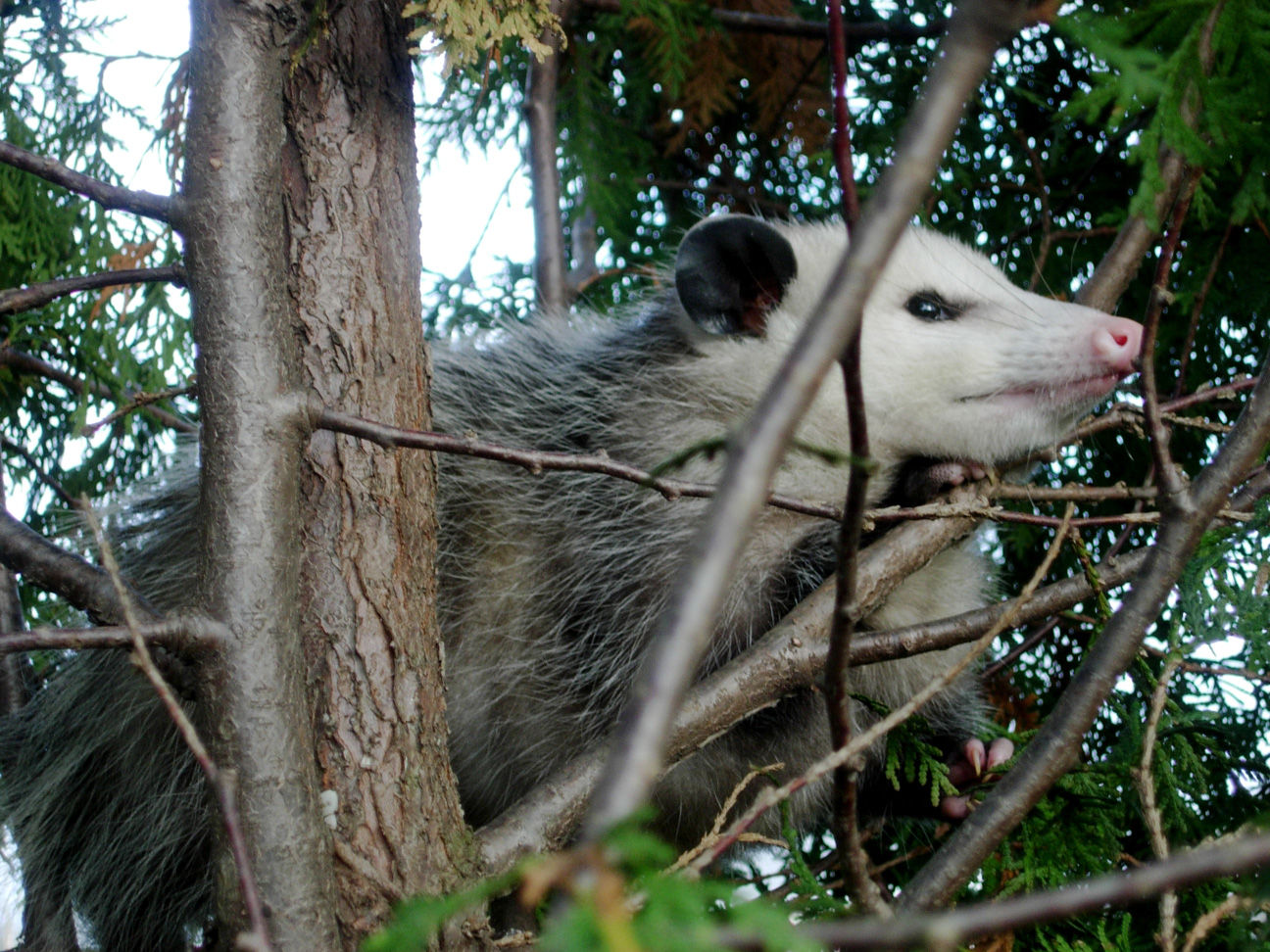
Virginia opossum being sheltered by an old tree

Urban forests and trees help purify water sources by slowing down rain as it falls to the earth and help it soak into the soil, thereby naturally filtering out pollutants that can potentially enter water supply sources. They reduce storm water runoff and mitigate flood damage, protecting the surrounding rivers and lakes. Trees also help alleviate the load on "grey" infrastructure (such as sewers and drains) via evapotranspiration. Trees are ideally suited as their canopies can intercept water (and provide dense vegetation), whilst their roots can pump substantial amounts of water back into the atmosphere as water vapor, all with a relatively small footprint.

=== Urban wildlife ===
Trees in urban forests provide food and shelter for wildlife in cities. Birds and small mammals use trees as nesting sites, and reptiles use the shade they provide to keep cool in the hot summer months. Furthermore, trees provide shade necessary for shrubbery. Not only do urban forests protect land animals and plants, they also sustain fish and water animals that need shade and lower temperatures to survive. Wealthier neighborhoods often have more tree cover (both community-subsidized and on private property) which results in an accumulation of benefits on those sections of a city; a study of neighborhoods in Los Angeles found higher levels of bird diversity in historically richer sections of town, and larger populations of synanthropic birds in historically poorer sections of town.

== Economic impacts ==
The economic benefits of trees and various other plants have been understood for a long time. Recently, more of these benefits are becoming quantified. Quantification of the economic benefits of trees helps justify public and private expenditures to maintain them. One of the most obvious examples of economic utility is the example of the deciduous tree planted on the south and west of a building (in the Northern Hemisphere), or north and east (in the Southern Hemisphere). The shade shelters and cools the building during the summer, but allows the sun to warm it in the winter after the leaves fall. The physical effects of trees—the shade (solar regulation), humidity control, wind control, erosion control, evaporative cooling, sound and visual screening, traffic control, pollution absorption and precipitation—all have economic benefits.

=== Energy and CO_{2} consumption ===
Urban forests contribute to the reduction of energy usage and CO_{2} emissions primarily through the indirect effects of an efficient forestry implementation. The shade provided by trees reduces the need for heating and cooling throughout the year. As a result, energy conservation is achieved which leads to a reduction of CO_{2} emissions by power plants. Computer models indicate that annual energy consumption can be reduced by 30 billion kWh using 100 million trees in U.S. urban areas. This energy consumption decrease equates to monetary savings of $2 billion. Additionally, the reduction of energy demand would reduce power plant CO_{2} emissions by 9 million tons per year.

=== Water filtration ===
The stormwater retention provided by urban forests can provide monetary savings even in arid regions where water is expensive or watering conservation is enforced. One example of this can be seen in a study carried out over 40 years in Tucson, AZ, which analyzed the savings of stormwater management costs. Over this period, it was calculated that $600,000 in stormwater treatment costs were saved. It was also observed that the net water consumption was reduced when comparing the water required for irrigation against power plant water consumption due to the effects of urban forests on energy usage.

In another instance, New York City leaders in the late 1990s chose to pursue a natural landscape management instead of an expensive water treatment system to clean the Catskill/Delaware watershed. New Yorkers today enjoy some of the healthiest drinking water in the world.

=== Tourism and local business expansion ===
The USDA Guide notes on page 17 that "Businesses flourish, people linger and shop longer, apartments and office space rent quicker, tenants stay longer, property values increase, new business and industry is attracted" by trees.

=== Increases in property values ===
Urban forests have been linked to an increase in property value surrounding residents. An empirical study from Finland showed a 4.9% increase in property valuation when located just one kilometer closer to a forest. Another source claims this increase can range as high as 20%. The reduction of air, light, and noise pollution provided by forests is cause for the notable pricing differentials.

== Sociological impacts ==
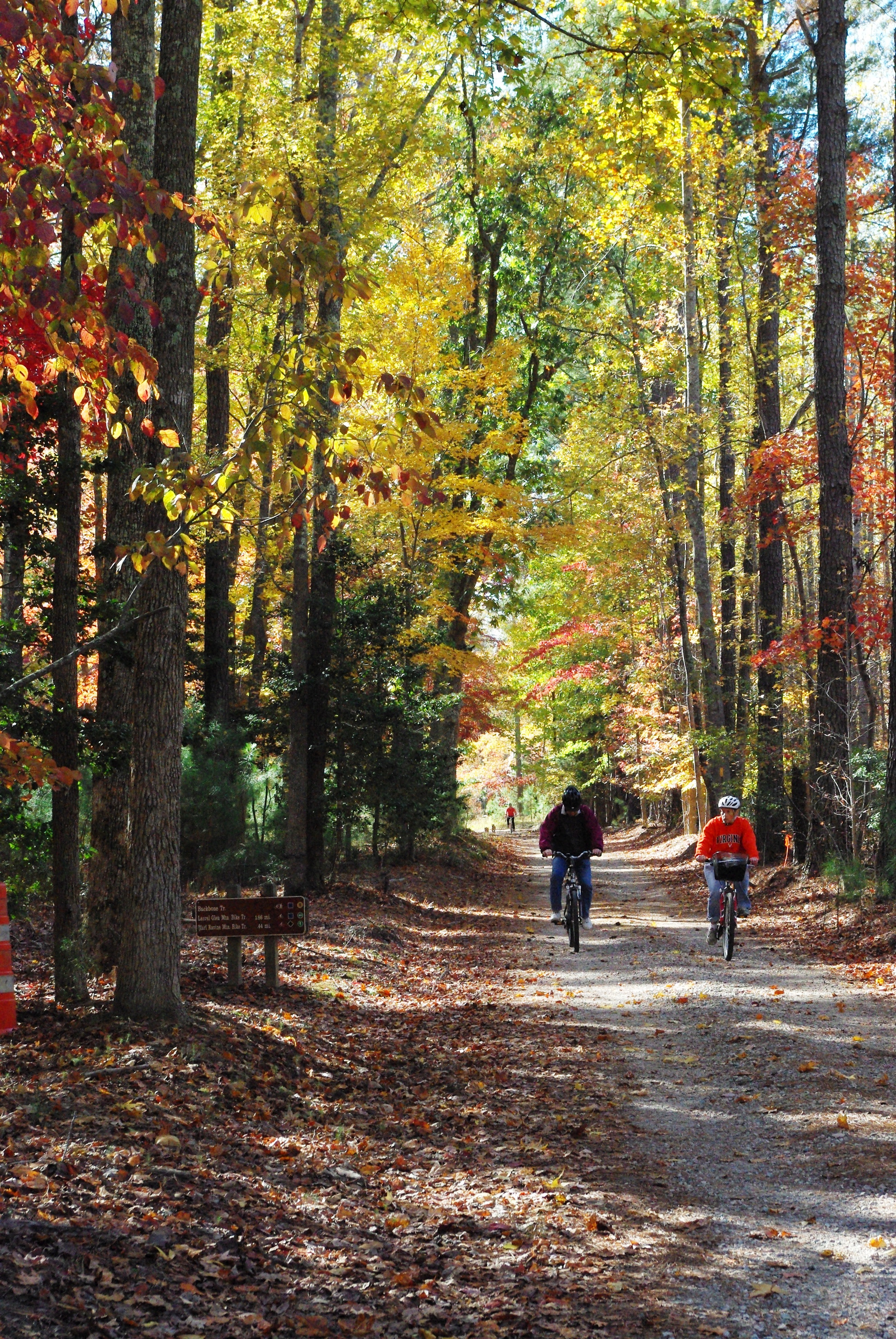
The Backbone Trail in the Santa Monica Mountains, California

=== Community health impact ===
Urban forests offer many benefits to their surrounding communities. Removing pollutants and greenhouse gases from the air is one key reason why cities are adopting the practice. Removing pollutants from the air, urban forests can lower risks of asthma and lung cancer. Communities that rely on well-water may also see a positive change in water purity due to filtration. The amenities provided by the city of each urban forest varies. Some amenities include trails and pathways for walking or running, picnic tables, and bathrooms. These healthy spaces provide for the community a place to gather and live a more active lifestyle.

=== Mental health impact ===
Living near urban forests have shown positive impacts on mental health. As an experimental mental health intervention in the city of Philadelphia, trash was removed from vacant lots, some of them being selectively "greened" by plantings trees, grass, and installing small fences. Residents near the "greened" lots who had incomes below the poverty line reported a 68% decrease in feelings of depression, while residents with incomes above the poverty line reported a decrease of 41%. The Biophilia hypothesis argues that people are instinctively drawn to nature, while Attention Restoration Theory goes on to demonstrate tangible improvements in medical, academic and other outcomes, from access to nature. Proper planning and community involvement are important for the positive results to be realized.

=== Increased home values and incomes ===
In addition to providing economic benefits at the community level, trees also benefit individual homeowners. A tree on a home's landscape or around the house can increase the dollar value received for the home upon sale. According to one study, a tree planted in the front yard can increase a home's sale price by $7,130 and raise the sale prices of surrounding homes. Healthy urban forests also correlate with higher incomes. In communities that have thriving urban forests, there are higher incomes, higher numbers of jobs associated with those communities, and higher productivity of workers.

== See also ==
- Green belt found around various urban clusters
- Million Tree Initiative in multiple urban areas in the world
- Tree Cities of the World
- Urban forestry
- Urban green space
- Urban prairie
- Urban reforestation
- Urban forest inequity
