= The Greening of Detroit =

U.S. nonprofit organization

- Formation: 1989
- Type: Nonprofit
- Location: Detroit, Michigan, United States
- Services: Reforestation, Urban forestry, Urban farming, Job training and workforce development, Environmental education
- President: Lionel Bradford
- Vice President: Monica Tabares
- Budget: USD $3.8 million (approximate)
- Website: greeningofdetroit.com

The Greening of Detroit is a 501(c)(3) non-profit environmental organization whose mission is to inspire the sustainable growth of a healthy urban community through trees, green spaces, healthy living, education, training and job opportunities. The Greening serves communities in Detroit, Highland Park and Hamtramck, Michigan.

== History ==
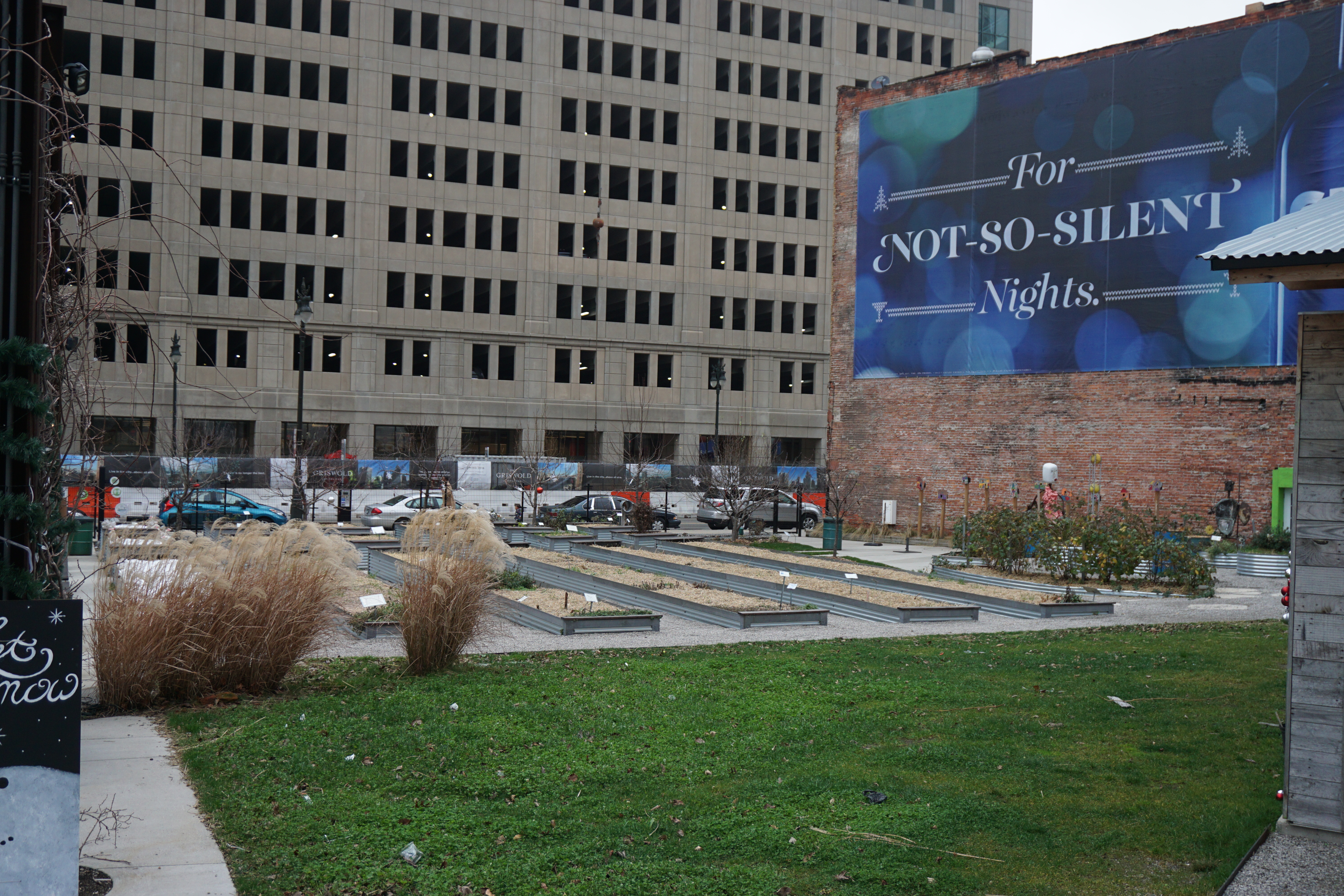
The Greening of Detroit's Lafayette Greens garden

In the late 19th and early 20th centuries, Detroit was known as the "City of Trees", boasting more trees per capita than any other industrial city in the world. Elms once dominated the boulevards, parks and neighborhoods, but after Dutch elm disease reached Detroit around 1950, the city began losing trees at an alarming rate. By 1980, more than half a million trees had died after succumbing to the disease or as the result of storms and urban expansion. During that same time period, economic constraints prohibited the City of Detroit from replacing the trees. With no routine maintenance to support it, Detroit's urban forest languished in a state of limbo for decades.

Devastated by the barren streets, Elizabeth Gordon Sachs, a champion of the city, mobilized residents, business owners and community leaders, and in 1989 they founded The Greening of Detroit as a nonprofit organization dedicated to helping the city raise funds for trees. For its first project, The Greening of Detroit secured $100,000 in donations for a 1990 planting along the median of Larned from Interstate-375 to Mt. Elliott, east of downtown.

As the city's economic situation deteriorated and the municipality's forestry department dwindled, The Greening's work expanded to include the planting of trees in addition to fundraising, beginning the longstanding community planting work for which it is well-known. Since the 1990s, The Greening has worked in neighborhoods throughout Detroit, Highland Park and Hamtramck to identify areas in need of trees, determine which trees would be best suited for the site, and to marshal a corps of funders, residents and volunteers to get them planted. By the end of 2024, The Greening of Detroit's decades-long efforts had resulted in over 166,000 trees planted with financial support from generous families, foundations and corporate partners, and with the help of tens of thousands of volunteers.

By the late 1990's, The Greening of Detroit began developing new programs to complement its community tree planting endeavor. These included the TreeKeepers Kids, a habitat life sciences program for K–12 students in Detroit schools; Camp Greening, a summer day camp program for elementary school-age children; and the Green Corps, a summer youth employment program for teens ages 14–18. The organization became an active participant in the urban agriculture movement beginning in 2003, leading an array of programs such as youth-based nutrition and gardening education at Romanowski Park in Detroit and at dozens of public-school gardens; the Garden Resource Program, an initiative that supported thousands of individual gardens throughout the city; and the Detroit Market Garden, a 2.5-acre urban farm adjacent to Eastern Market (now managed by Keep Growing Detroit). In 2010, with funding from the American Recovery and Reinvestment Act, The Greening of Detroit launched its first adult workforce development program in partnership with Southwest Solutions to provide unemployed Detroiters with training for green sector jobs.

In March 2024, the Gilbert Family Foundation announced a $1.8 million, three-year investment in The Greening of Detroit to strengthen the organization's impact in Detroit. The contribution represented the largest private philanthropic donation in The Greening of Detroit's history.

== Current Programs ==
=== Urban Forestry ===
Detroit has a 31% tree canopy cover, yet with 47% of its land still impervious surface, there is ample opportunity, and need, to continue these efforts. Vacant lots, which still make up more than 15% of land cover in the city, hold huge potential for revitalization as vibrant green spaces. In response, The Greening of Detroit engages thousands of volunteers each year who contribute to tree planting efforts that take place in Detroit, Highland Park and Hamtramck. Plantings typically take place on public property such as parks, or property owned by a school, faith-based or non-profit organization, or private but shared property such as a community garden. Applications are submitted by block groups, faith-based organizations, businesses and resident associations, and projects are selected based on site location, need for trees, access to water source, community support, and available funding. In 2022, The Greening of Detroit joined the City of Detroit, DTE Energy and other partners to launch an initiative designed to accelerate reforestation efforts in neighborhoods that have the greatest need for increased tree canopy by training and employing local residents for jobs on tree planting and maintenance crews. Project partners expect to plant more than 75,000 trees, employ over 300 Detroit residents in tree care and maintenance jobs, and invest $30 million in Detroit neighborhoods during the five-year pilot phase of the project.

=== Detroit Conservation Corps ===
The organization's Detroit Conservation Corps (DCC) workforce development program was started in 2010, in partnership with LaSalle Bank. The program provides unemployed residents in Detroit, Hamtramck, and Highland Park job training and certification in the landscape industry. Recruitment efforts target people who have struggled to overcome barriers to maintaining a full-time job, such as incarceration, substance abuse, homelessness, lack of education or job skills. The six-week long program is registered as a U.S. Department of Labor pre-apprenticeship program. DCC is structured as a social enterprise model: participants receive a stipend, along with on-the-job training, workplace readiness skill development, safety coursework, and academic refreshers. "The ultimate goal is to retain 30% of DCC trainees after graduation to support fee-for-service projects. These projects help us sustain and control support that gets put back in the training of Detroiters in green jobs," says Lionel Bradford, President of The Greening of Detroit.

=== Green Corps ===
The Green Corps is a youth workforce development program providing young people ages 14–18 an opportunity to earn a paycheck, explore environmental careers, and learn about ways to maintain and expand green spaces. Approximately 2,000 young Detroiters have passed through Green Corps since 1998, cumulatively earning more than $2.1 million in wages, and learning how to hold jobs, handle money, and care for their urban community. Green Corps is a hands-on way to expose youth to careers in urban forestry and related fields. Some program graduates have received scholarships to pursue studies in environmental science at Michigan State University, Southern University, and other institutions.

=== Meyers Nursery ===
The Greening of Detroit manages the Walter I. Meyers Nursery, a tree nursery located on a 72-acre parcel in Rouge Park in Detroit. Originally established in 1920 by the City of Detroit to supply trees for the city, it fell into disuse by the 1950s due to the rise of commercial nurseries. In 2017, The Greening of Detroit took over management of the nursery, partnering with the municipality to revitalize it as a source of trees for city reforestation projects. The Greening has since planted over 4,000 trees in the nursery and harvested its first 200 trees in 2024, which were mature enough to be transplanted at parks and other public spaces in the community. Also located on the site is The Greening of Detroit's Meyer Tree Nursery Retention Pond, which is designed to collect surface flow for reuse in tree irrigation. The pond can hold back two consecutive 100-year storm events, helping to mitigate existing erosion and water quality issues within the Upper Rouge River. Besides functioning as the water source for the trees under production, the site provides habitat and environmental education. Native plants, water fowl, crayfish, wild turkey, and coyote can all be observed here.

=== TreeKeepers Kids ===
The TreeKeepers Kids program is a place- and science-based education program delivered to junior kindergarten through high school students in Detroit schools, parks and recreation sites, and public library branches. Students participate in programming, and help to plant trees at their schools or nearby parks. This program educates students by enhancing their environmental awareness and encouraging them to become environmental stewards in their community, while the trees planted provide additional shade and enhance their ownership over the schoolyards.

=== Lafayette Greens ===
Built on the former site of the historic Lafayette Building, Lafayette Greens is a nearly half-acre green space and urban garden in the downtown district of Detroit. With 35 raised beds, fruit trees, a children's garden and more, Lafayette Greens works as a demonstration garden with edible foods and green space for relaxation. The award-winning garden, created by Kenneth Weikal Landscape Architecture, was donated to The Greening of Detroit by Compuware in 2014 and is a place of beauty. Many of the materials used in the garden are re-used from around the city, including pavers made from old sidewalks. Community members can also learn about how irrigation and water systems work. Lafayette Greens was chosen by the American Society of Landscape Architects as one of 40 case studies to show, "the transformative effects of sustainable landscape design," in its Designing Our Future: Sustainable Landscapes Initiative.

== Detroit's "Heritage Narrative" ==
Christine E. Carmichael, a researcher from the University of Michigan, published research in 2019 that revealed that some Detroit residents were resistant to The Greening of Detroit's tree-planting efforts, finding that about 25% of Detroit residents declined to have trees planted near their homes between 2011 and 2014. Carmichael found that the opposition in Detroit resulted primarily from negative past experiences with street trees, particularly in low-income neighborhoods grappling with blight from vacant properties. In 2014 alone, the city had an estimated 20,000 dead or hazardous trees, following the contraction of Detroit's once-massive tree maintenance program from budget cuts and population decline. Carmichael discovered that skepticism of the program was tied to residents' wider distrust of the city government and outside groups in parts of Detroit. Historically, both large scale tree removals and planting efforts were done without much regard for residents' input, resulting in what Carmichael calls "heritage narrative", – or, selective representations of the city's history and character – that remain unaddressed in city planning efforts. For many long-term residents, wariness of the new trees was driven by past experiences of caring for vacant properties in their neighborhood. They believed responsibility for maintaining the trees would eventually fall to them. "This research shows how local government actions can cause residents to reject environmental efforts – in this case, street trees – that would otherwise be in people's interests," says Carmichael.

In response to Carmichael's research, The Greening of Detroit worked to restore community trust by expanding active community engagement and outreach programs that involve residents in planning and planting efforts. Increased spending by the City of Detroit's forestry department to remove dead and dying trees, as well as a change in the organization's leadership, led the group to focus more on community engagement. The Greening of Detroit instituted community engagement training for the youth they hire to water street trees and interact with residents; hosted tree give-away events; and began working with community tree advocates to encourage them to share information with their neighbors. "As a result of our refined focus, [our program] has brought thousands of residents together to not only plant trees, but gain a greater understanding of the benefits of trees in their communities," says Monica Tabares, Vice President of The Greening of Detroit.

== See also ==
- Hantz Woodlands
- Urban ecology
- Urban forestry
- Urban reforestation
