= Nashville Highland Rim Forest =

Major Urban Forest in Nashville, Tennessee

Coordinates: 36°12′N 86°57′W

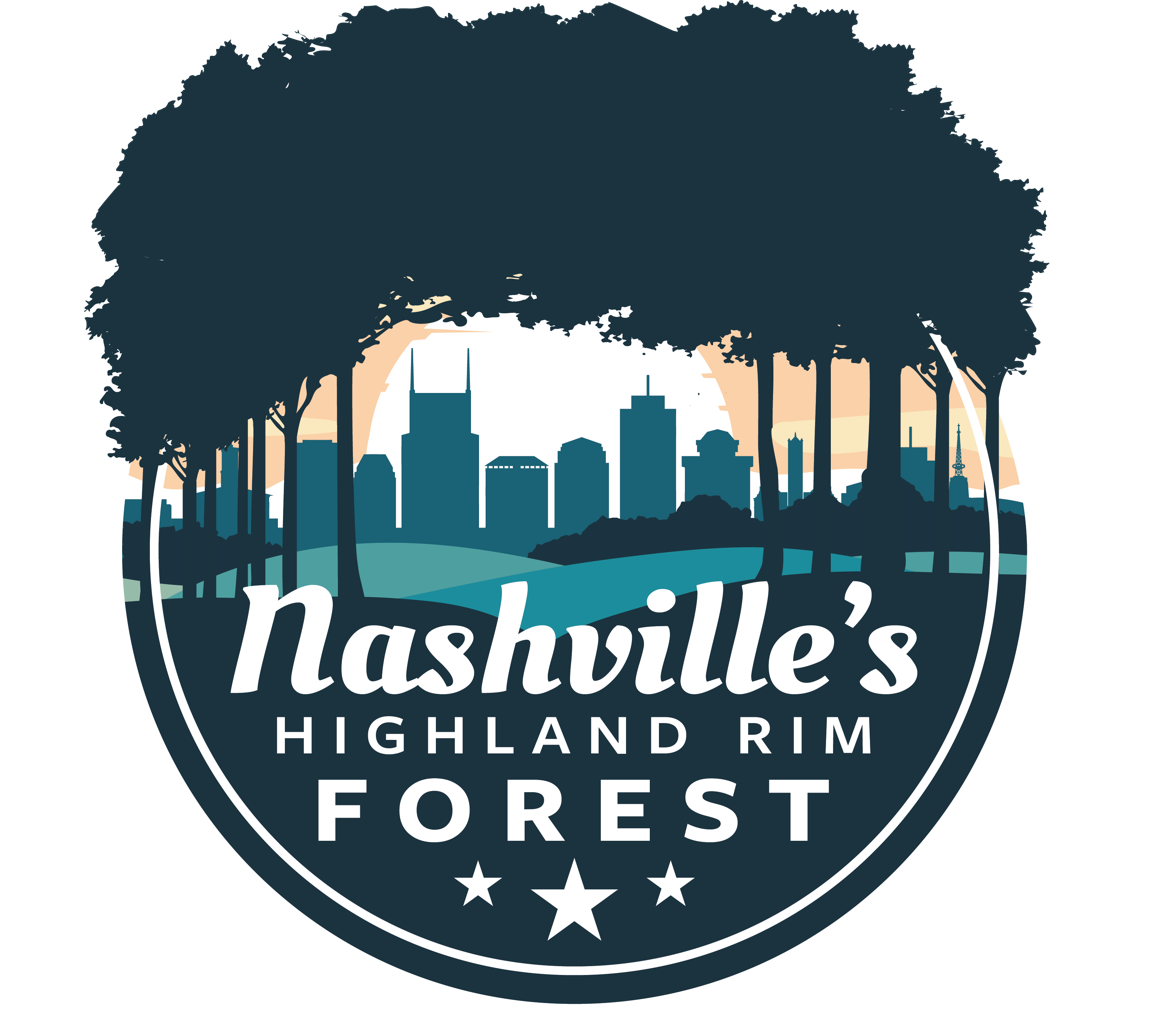
Logo for Nashville's Highland Rim Forest

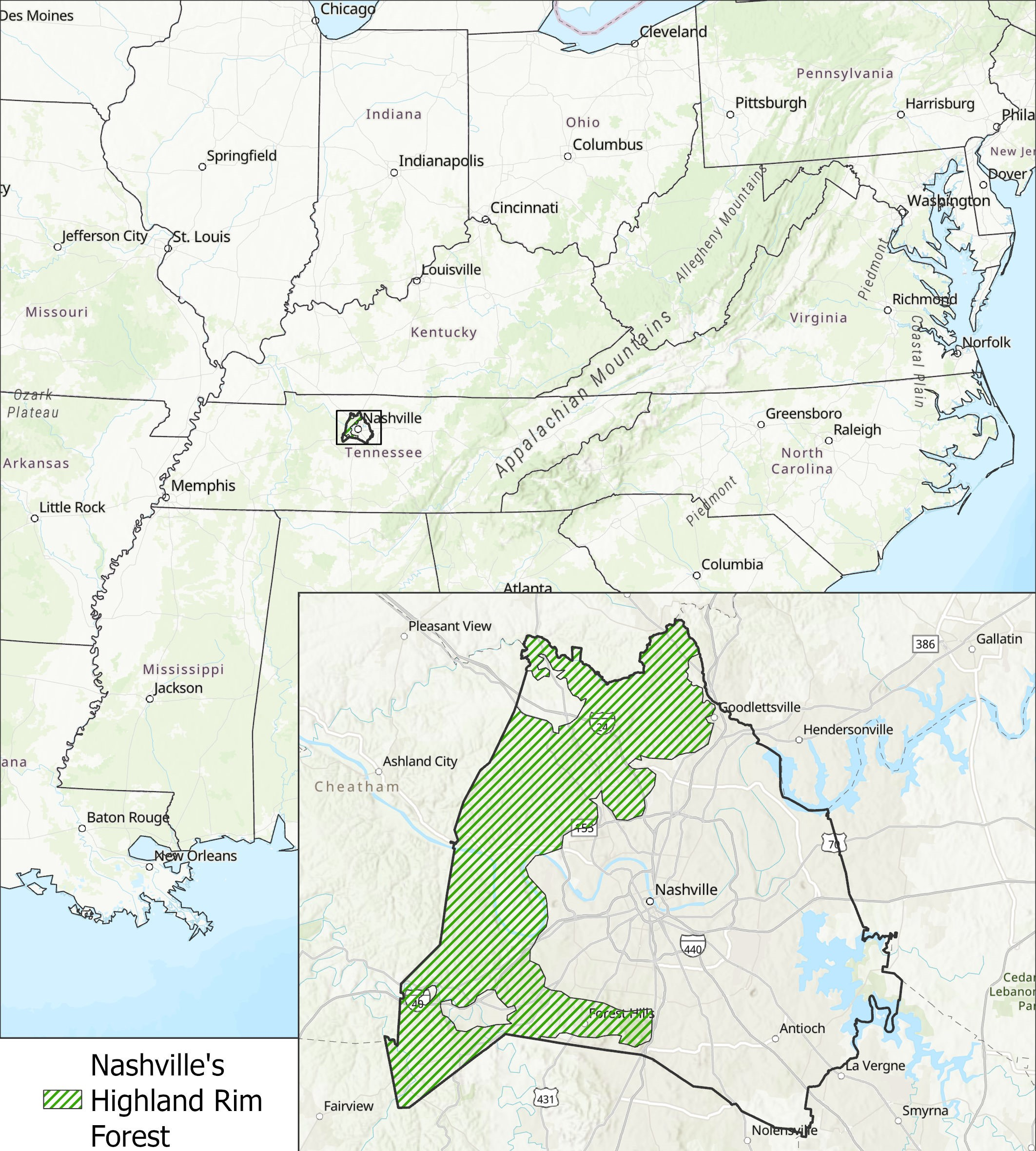
Location within Metropolitan Nashville-Davidson County

The Nashville Highland Rim Forest (NHRF) is an urban forest and geobiological area within the combined city-county limits of Metropolitan Nashville, Tennessee. The forest consists of a distinctive, nearly continuous, mature hardwood tree canopy in an area of steep to moderate slopes and rugged topography. It is on a rim of hills that encircles the Central Basin in which Nashville sits. NHRF is on the eastern escarpment of a larger, multi-county expanse of elevated uplands that form the Western Highland Rim physiographic region and ecoregion. The NHRF covers an area of 97,000 acres. Four other urban forests among the "world's largest" urban forests sum to a total of less than half the size of NHRF, making it one of the largest urban forests within the city limits of a major city (population >500,000).

== Geology and physiographic setting ==
Nashville's urban core is in the Central Basin. The western side of Nashville contains the Western Highland Rim (WHR) upon which NHFR sits. The WHR also coincides with one of the nine major ecoregions within Tennessee, consisting of rolling terrain with plains and open hills, with elevations ranging from 400 to 1000 feet.

The bedrock consists mostly of chert, cherty limestone, calcareous silica stone, and shale. Soils here tend to be acidic and low-to-moderate in fertility. The more fertile, neutral soils formed on the more calcium-rich substrates. The steep slopes in western Nashville are especially prone to landslides. More than 560 landslides were mapped in Nashville following a major flood event in May 2010. These were primarily within areas of NHRF.

== Delineation ==
Nashville consolidated with Davidson County to form a combined city-county Metro Nashville Government in 1962. The consolidation was not a city or county taking over the government, but a new government management system. The charter voted upon became a model for future government consolidations. This expanded the city limits to 526 square miles, making it one of the largest U.S. cities by area.

Delineation of NHRF was based on the U.S. Fish and Wildlife Service's (USFWS) Southeast Conservation Blueprint (SECAS Blueprint) database, used by multiple state, federal, and private organizations to rank and identify priority areas for conservation throughout the southeast U.S. The Tennessee Wildlife Resources Agency (TWRA) collaborated with The Nature Conservancy and other partners to define the most prioritized conservation areas within the State of Tennessee, including the Western Highland Rim's forests, using the SECAS Blueprint database and model. Nashville includes a sizable portion of a large multi-county, conservation-priority area known as the Western Highland Rim Forests Conservation Opportunity Area (COA) identified by Tennessee in the TWRA 2015 State Wildlife Action Plan (SWAP).

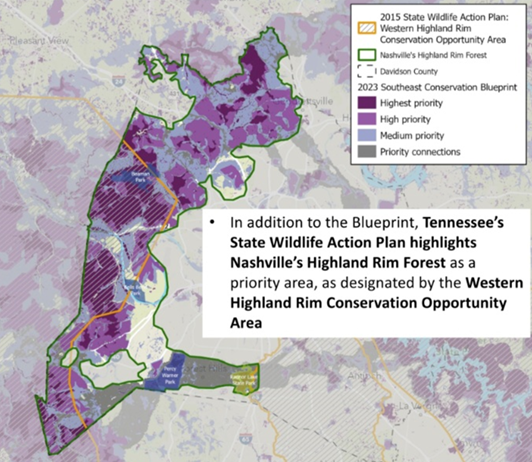
97,000 acres prioritized as having key conservation values shown in purple

Using the same USFWS SECAS Blueprint that identified TWRA's Western Highland Rim Forests COA, the USFWS identified a 127,000-acre nearly continuous, mature canopy forested area in Nashville, with 97,000 acres ranked as "priority". This 97,000-acre priority conservation forested land within Metro Nashville-Davidson County has been identified as Nashville's Highland Rim Forest (NHRF).

NHRF is a major component of Nashville's entire urban tree canopy shown to cover 56% of the land surface (excluding a small percent of water surfaces) in the urban tree canopy assessment published by Nashville in 2023. This percentage rivals the percentage of tree canopy cover of any U.S. city. Additionally, in the Nashville tree canopy report, Nashville's large geographic span of over 500 square miles (320,000 acres) tallied 170,000 acres of total urban tree canopy placing Nashville's canopied acres at the top of any city exceeding 500,000.

Four urban forests considered to be among the world's largest: Sanjay Gandhi National Park in Mumbai, India - 25,689 acres; Tijuca National Park in Rio de Janeiro, Brazil - 9,782 acres; The Great Trinity Forest in Dallas, Texas, USA - 6,000 acres; Forest Park in Portland, Oregon, USA - 5,200 acres. The combined acreage of these urban forests is 46,671 acres, less than half the size of Nashville's Highland Rim Forest. If all of the tree canopy of Nashville were included, its urban forest would equate to 170,000 acres, an even larger extent of coverage.

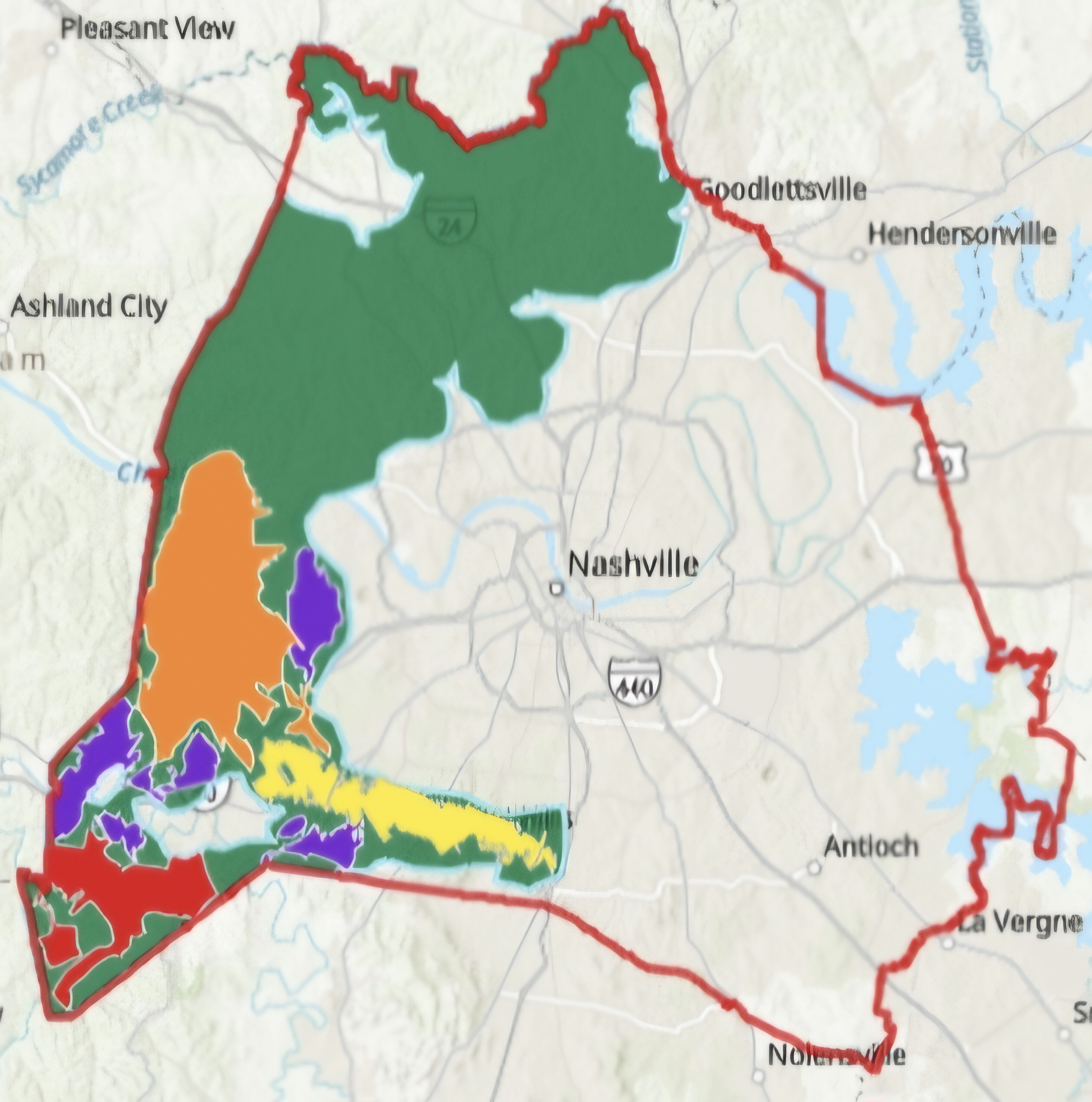
Scaled footprints of 4 other urban forests; examples fitted within Nashville's Highland Rim Forest shown in green

== History of Tennessee forests ==
From the perspective of the preservation of Forest Habitat in Tennessee, the steep and hilly terrain across much of the state offered more protection than did any other single factor. The abundant timber resources were recognized by the state’s earliest settlers. A century later, Civil War soldiers from adjoining states still made note of the richness of Tennessee’s natural resources, especially in the hilly eastern forests.

The slow introduction of an extensive railroad network stalled the wholesale logging that began earlier in adjacent states such as Virginia and Kentucky. With only twelve hundred miles of track in Tennessee in the 1850s, the industrial extraction of timber was deferred, thus occurring between 1880 and 1920. Getting the cut trees to the mills was a limiting factor. Once mills opened in larger centers along rail lines with river access, floating rafts of logs were carried along swollen streams with spring rains. The Cumberland River fed such mills from logging operations upstream of Nashville.

Federal foresters reported that the inaccessibility due to challenges in transporting logs accounted for Tennessee’s eastern forests being largely intact in 1901. The early 1800s had seen a small-scale, iron foundry industry underway in locations where minerals were available for smelting. This demand for producing charcoal to heat the ore had resulted in another window of localized timber harvesting around smelting operations. It was not until the 1930s that the eroded hillsides from the 1880s to 1920s timber boom, prompted the Civil Conservation Corps to begin reforestation and soil conservation. Prior to WWII, over 63 million trees and 554,000 pounds of hardwood seeds had been planted.

The forests of the Western Highland Rim experienced some logging and fragmentation of its flatter expanses to convert to pasture and agricultural use. The hills of the Highland Rim imposed the same limitations to the broad scale clearing of wooded slopes as did the steeper terrain of eastern Tennessee’s geography.

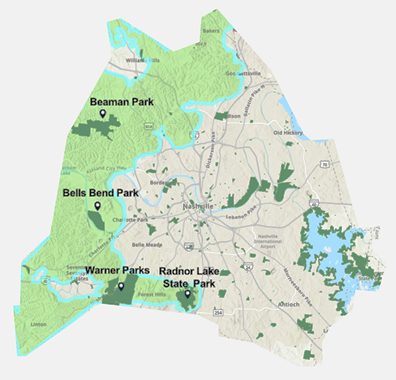
Four major parks within the borders of Nashville's Highland Rim Forest

== Public amenities in existing parks and greenways within forest area ==
The NHRF contains 4 natural-area parks with a combined area of 7,544 acres and 94 miles of hiking and bridle path trails: Beaman Park, Bells Bend Park, Warner Parks, and Radnor Lake State Natural Area. The Hill Forest in Nashville’s Warner Parks is one of the largest tracts of uncut forest within any urban setting in the United States. Together, with the Burch Reserve and old growth Hill Forest, nearly 500 acres were acquired in 2009 and added to Warner Parks holdings. The 225-acre old growth forest received added protection in 2010 by being recognized as the Hill Forest Designated State Natural Area.

Collective offerings available in the Parks with Trails and Greenways in Nashville's Highland Rim Forest
Parks and Greenways	Owner	Area (acres)	Total trails: paved and unpaved (miles)	Unpaved footpaths (miles)	Paved pedestrian/bike trails (miles)	Mountain bike trails (miles)	Shared equine and pedestrian trails (miles)
Warner Parks	Metropolitan Nashville	3,112	65	17	26	8	18
Beaman Park	Metropolitan Nashville	2,370	15	15	—	—	—
Radnor Lake State Park	State of Tennessee	1,368	7.8	5.9	1.9	—	—
Bells Bend Park	Metropolitan Nashville	808	7.4	6.0	5.5	—	—
Harpeth River State Park-Hidden Lake	State of Tennessee	640	3.0	2.5	0.5	—	—
Harpeth River Greenway	Metropolitan Nashville	?	9.2	—	9.2	—	—
Brookmeade Greenway	Metropolitan Nashville	?	0.4	—	0.4	—	—
Whites Creek Greenway at Fontanel	Metropolitan Nashville	?	3.3	1.8	1.5	—	—
Total		8,298	111	48	45	8	18

== Conservation history of NHRF ==
The network of hills and parkland along the western edge of Nashville have been recognized for several decades as having the potential to be formally connected as an ecological corridor of protected habitat. In 2006, Noah Charney initiated such an undertaking in founding a nonprofit known as Radnor to River (R2R). The West Meade Naturalist website under R2R contains information pertaining to this ecosystem and its urban forest habitat.

Noah Charney's PhD in Biology now finds him as an Assistant Professor of Conservation Biology at the University of Maine, and his quest to see this corridor become a reality continues. R2R's name draws from starting at Radnor Lake State Park along Nashville’s southern border and envisions moving west to Warner Parks, then up to the banks of the Cumberland River. Since R2R’s founding, two additional Metro parks have been established on the north side of the river - Bells Bend Park, opened to the public in 2007, and Beaman Park, which was formally designated in 2013.

Development pressures on the hillside slopes in Nashville’s West Meade neighborhood prompted the most urgent conservation efforts. Action was focused there in containing apartments and housing demands where they are highest along a major artery. Several successes were achieved, including getting a tiny waterfall on a vulnerable site placed under Metro Nashville’s conservation protection. A committed network continues to stay vigilant in watching Nashville's West Meade vicinity.

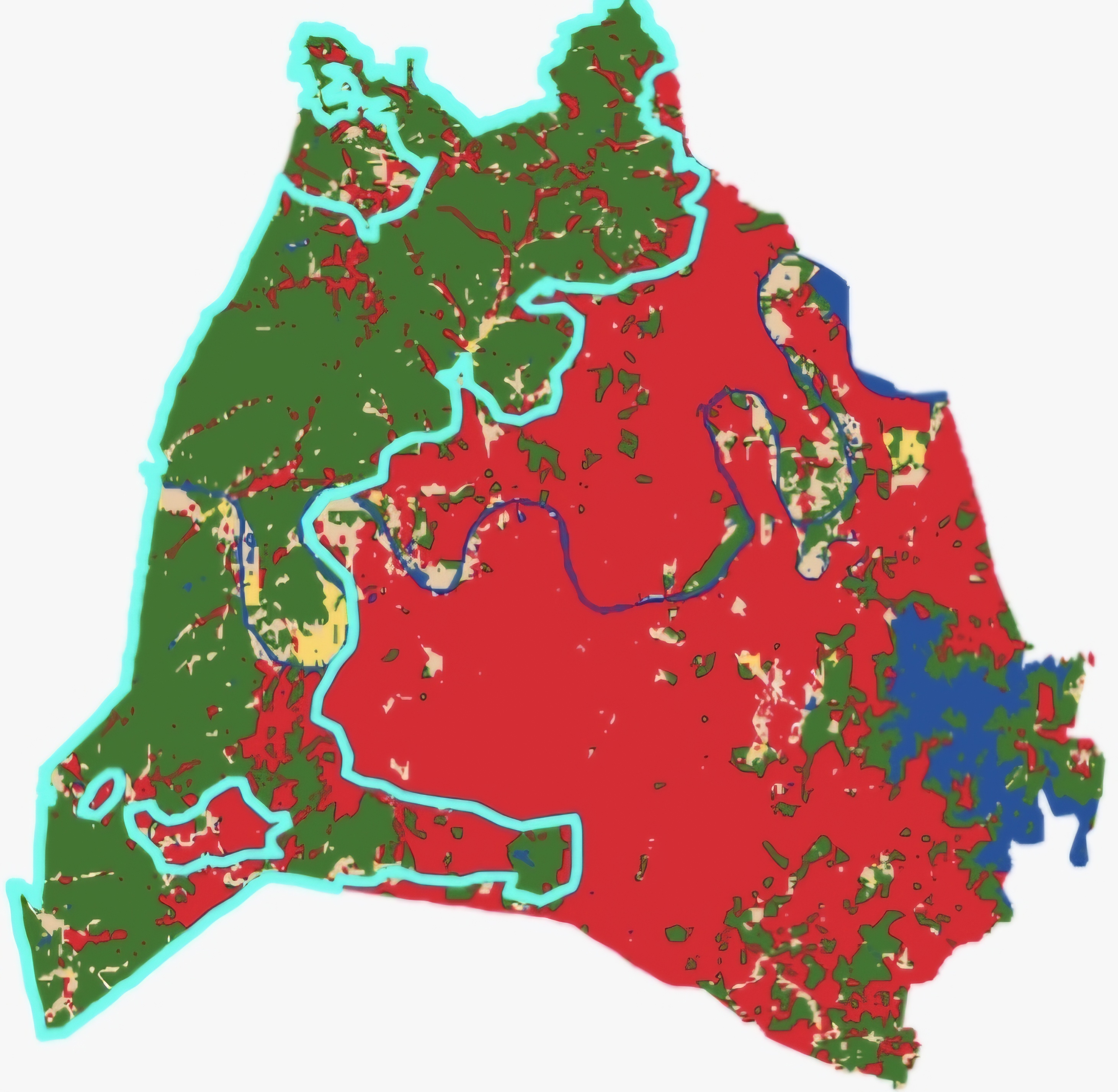
Land use cover - Tree Canopy (green) within Nashville

In 2023 the Alliance to Conserve Nashville’s Highland Rim Forest organized itself following a Metro Nashville budget hearing to request more funding on conservation investments as noted in numerous local planning studies.

Because more than 90% of the NHRF is privately owned, long-term conservation of these forested lands will require multiple approaches, such as land acquisition for additional local or state parks, voluntary conservation easements protecting private lands from forest removal, and land-use zoning protections. For example, the Tennessee - Land Trust Alliance collaborates across nonprofits engaged in educating and connecting landowners to opportunities for placing conservation easements on holdings they will continue to own.

These nonprofits take responsibility to ensure that the terms of the owner are protected in perpetuity. Among Nashville's primary conservation-easement-holding nonprofits are The Land Trust for Tennessee, TennGreen Land Conservancy, the Swan Conservation Trust, and The Cumberland River Compact.

These organizations collaborate with the Friends of Beaman Park, Friends of Warner Parks, Sierra Club of Middle Tennessee, The Nature Conservancy of TN, and other habitat-saving advocacy organizations. Currently the rural transect around Joelton, Whites Creek, and Beaman Park in Nashville's rural northwestern portion, which lies within the NHRF, is under pressure for greater development.

== Ecology ==
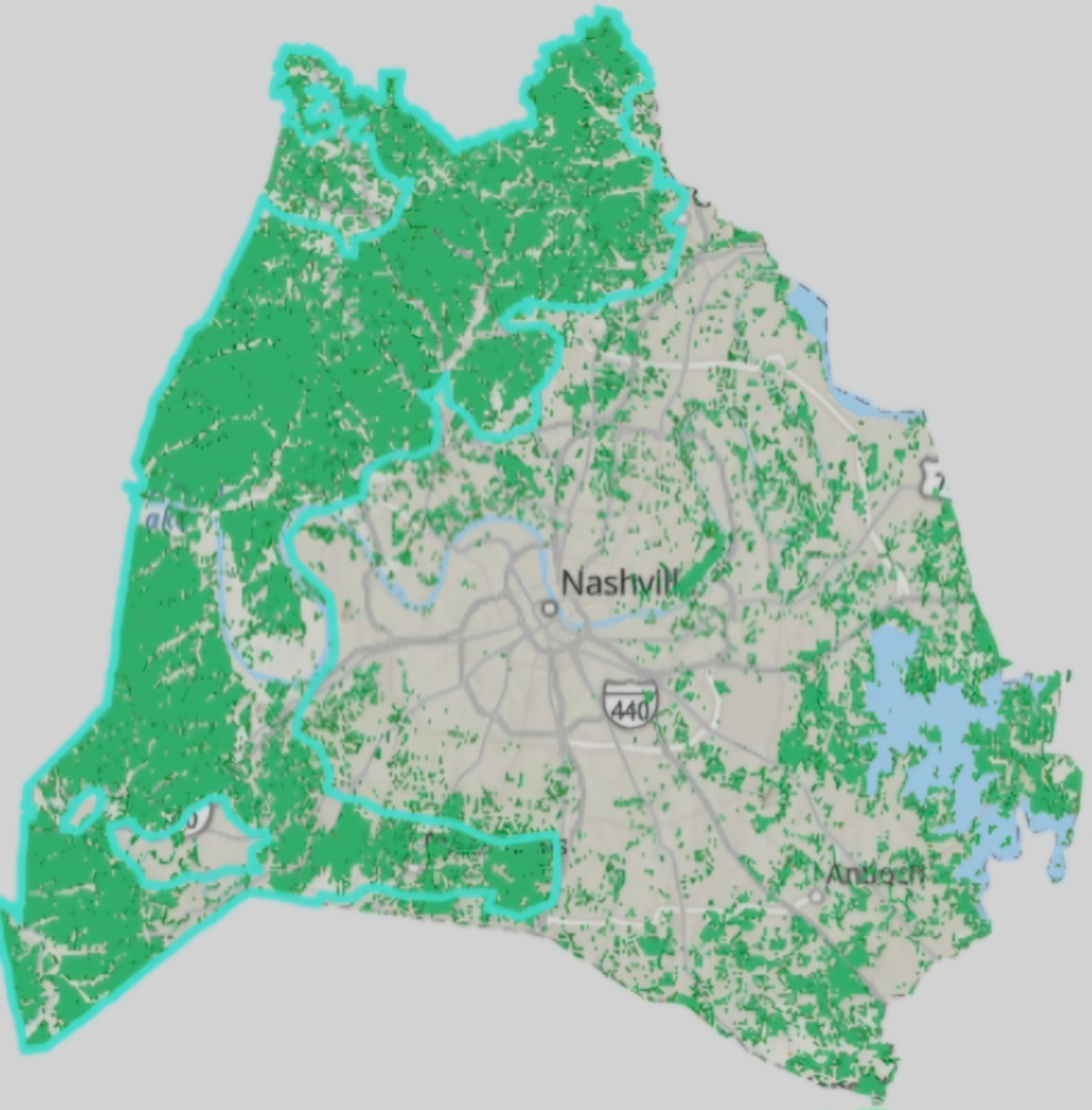
Carbon bank within Nashville

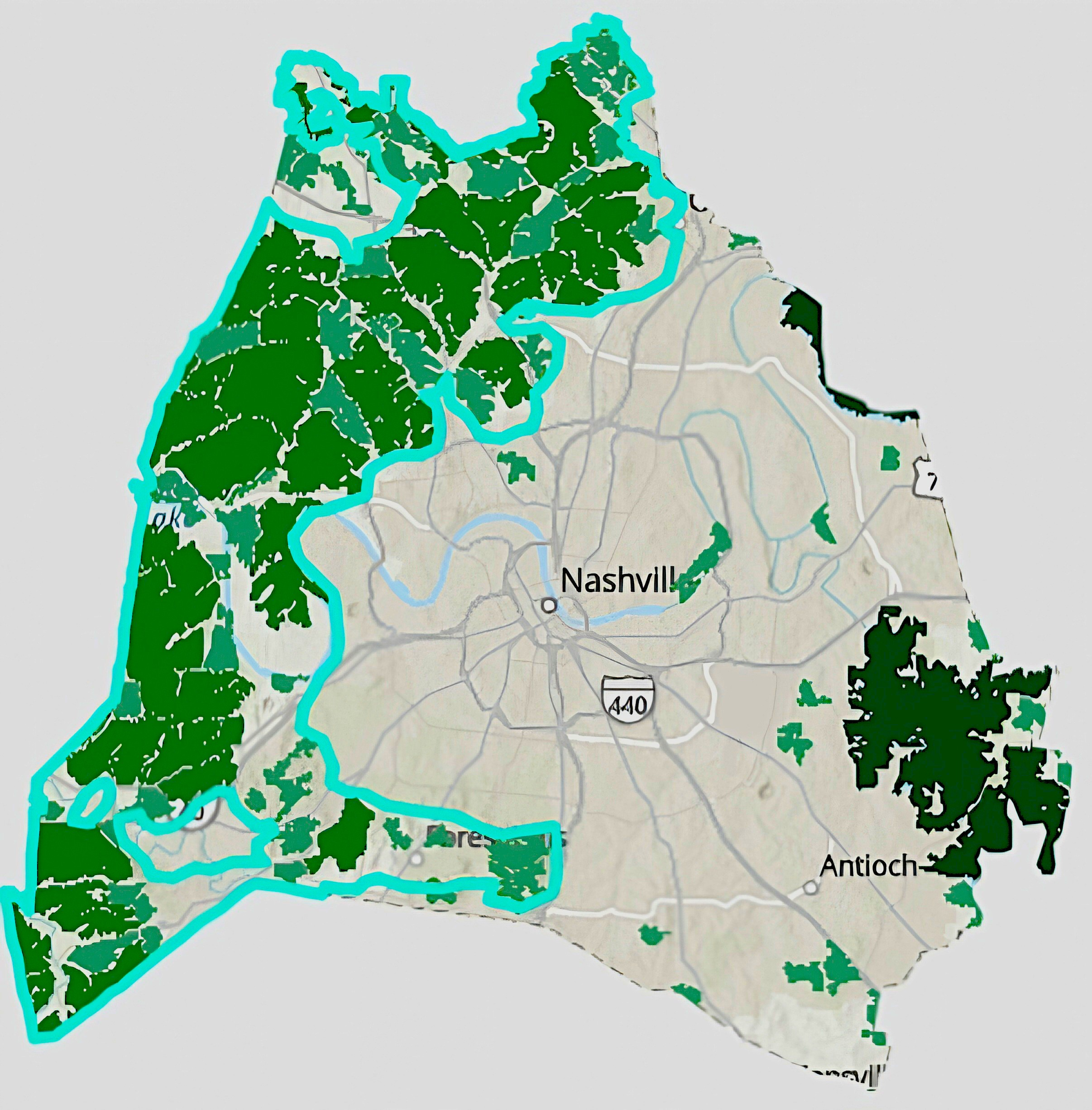
Intact habitat cores within Nashville

Within the WHR region, parts of the oak-hickory natural vegetation were deforested in the mid to late 1800’s, a result of iron-ore related mining and smelting of the mineral limonite, but the region has recovered and now is again heavily forested. Parts of the NHRF contain protected old growth forest lands, e.g. the Hill Forest. The extent of NHRF's intact habitats remaining within Nashville's city limits drive the urgency to assist owners in placing conservation easements on their land to try to avoid forest fragmentation.

This region is predominantly covered in oak-hickory forests, with some presence of species from the more moisture-rich mixed mesophytic forests to the east. Dominant tree species included white oak (Quercus alba), various hickories (Carya sp.), northern red oak (Quercus rubra), black oak (Quercus velutina), tuliptree (Liriodendron tulipifera), and red maple (Acer rubrum). Floodplains and bottomlands of the region support the pin oak (Quercus palustris), American sweetgum (Liquidambar styraciflua), eastern cottonwood (Populus deltoides), American sycamore (Platanus occidentalis), common hackberry (Celtis occidentalis), and elm.

The region is still mostly forested, owing to its soils which are poorly-suited to Western agriculture. There is some pastureland and cropland, existing mainly on the flatter terraces of rivers and larger streams, and on the flatter uplands that are most common in the southernmost portions of this region. The region still has some agriculture, focused on hay and cattle, with some corn and tobacco. Agricultural spaces support the growth of broomsedge bluestem (Andropogon virginicus) and sumacs (Rhus sp.), which develops into early-successional forest of eastern redcedar (Juniperus virginiana) and black locust (Robinia pseudoacacia).
