= Friends of the Urban Forest =

U.S. nonprofit organization

Friends of the Urban Forest (FUF) is a United States non-profit organization based in San Francisco that plants and maintains trees within the city of San Francisco and its surroundings.

FUF was organized as a response to San Francisco's lack of trees. The group's first tree planted was a glossy privet on Arbor Day, 1981, in Noe Valley. As of 2006, the organization had planted approximately 40,000 trees.

== Background ==
San Francisco was originally mostly sand dunes and had only a small population of native trees. Fog, wind, cold weather, and salty air made it difficult for native and planted trees to survive. Only buckeye and Pacific willow were common.

Most of the 90,000 trees in the city were planted in the 1880s through 1920s as part of large parks and properties. Monterey pines and Eucalyptus trees were planted in the San Francisco Presidio, Stern Grove, and Golden Gate Park. However, these Monterey pines have been affected by pitch pine canker and have been dying.

== Importance ==
At 12%, San Francisco's tree canopy cover remains considerably under the 22% national average. Benefits to planting more trees include aesthetics, improved property values (mature trees are said to increase surrounding property values by approximately 1%), helping with global warming by absorbing carbon dioxide and providing oxygen, and energy savings due to increased tree canopy.

Even at more than 5,000 trees per year as of 2006, San Francisco's tree-planting efforts were modest compared to other cities in California and throughout the world. That year Los Angeles announced plans to plant one million trees, and the United Nations had raised funds to plant 121 million trees towards a goal of one billion trees.

== See also ==
- Andy Lipkis
