= Million Tree Initiative =

Environmental project

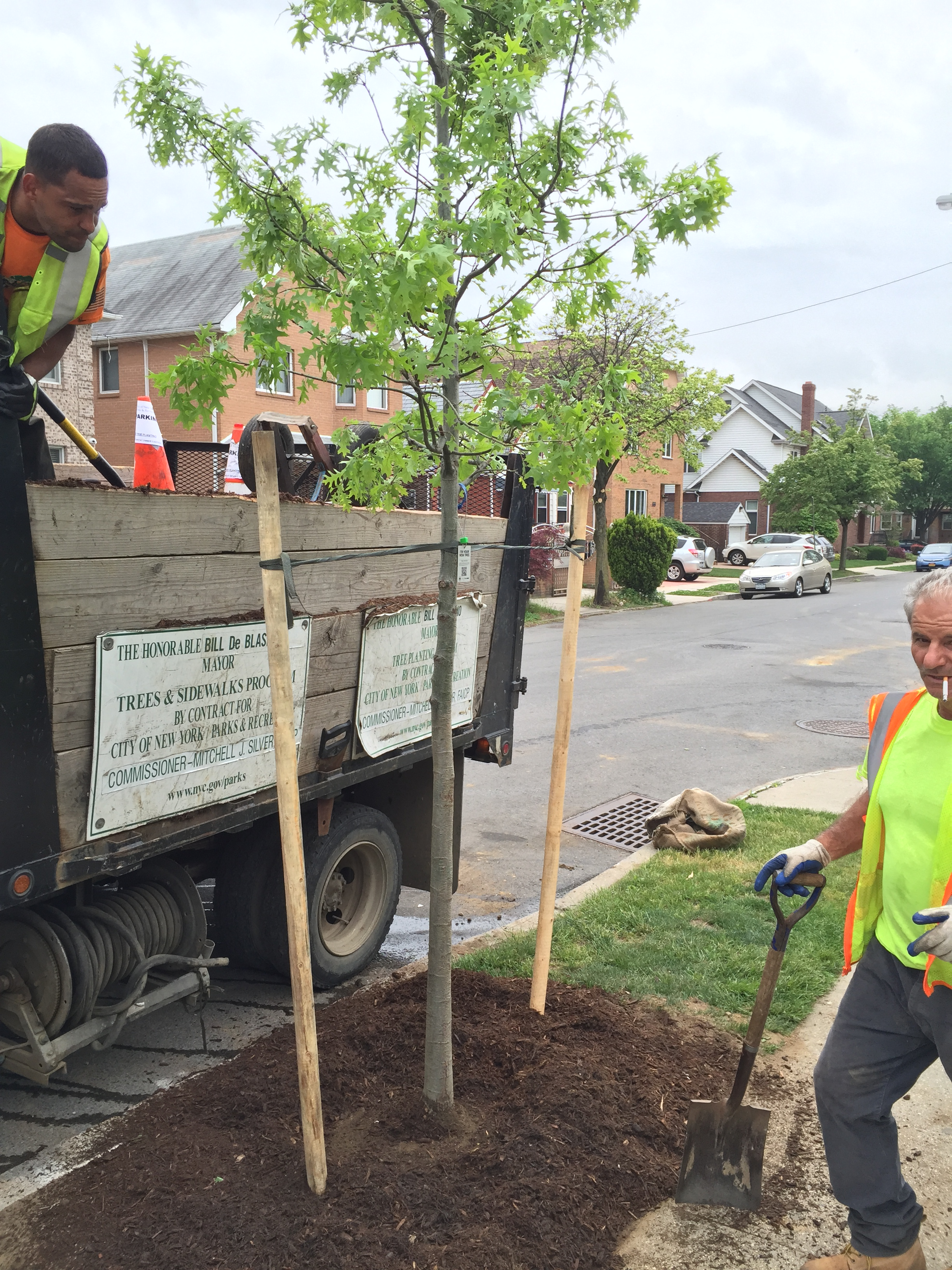

The Million Tree Initiative refers to the ongoing environmental projects that multiple cities have individually committed to and aimed at expanding urban forestry through the planting of one million trees. This initiative is part of a higher global movement, not only does it intend to act and diminish climate change, it also plans to lower both the urban heat as well as also enhance the air quality in many places. Cities that are known to be currently involved in this initiative are: Los Angeles, Denver, New York City, Shanghai, London, Ontario, and Amherst, New York. A common motive shared between these participating cities is, according to their mission statements, the reduction of carbon dioxide in the air to reduce the effects of global warming. Beyond these environmental advantages, these effort to plant the trees, also shows signs and effects when it comes to biodiversity, improving public health, and fostering sustainable urban development.

== History ==
In May 2006, Mayor Antonio Villaraigosa made Million Trees LA one of his campaign promises. This initiative was planned to plant trees between 2006 and 2010 and the trees were expected to provide environmental benefits and were predicted to continue to grow until 2040. This campaign is important and can increase urban woods as a piece of infrastructure that can assist cities in mitigating their environment. The purpose of this initiative will also reduce emissions and save energy. The Los Angeles project is funded by a mix of federal money and municipal funding, charities, and corporate donations. It was one of among forty winners from 200 nominees to obtain a United States Environmental Protection Agency (EPA) Environmental Award in 2009.

The Mile High Million, an initiative started by then Mayor John Hickenlooper, is a similar program in Denver, Colorado. This was announced by Hickenlooper in his 2006 State of the City Address. This Initiative helped these trees be implemented in forests in Los Angeles and even other cities like New York.

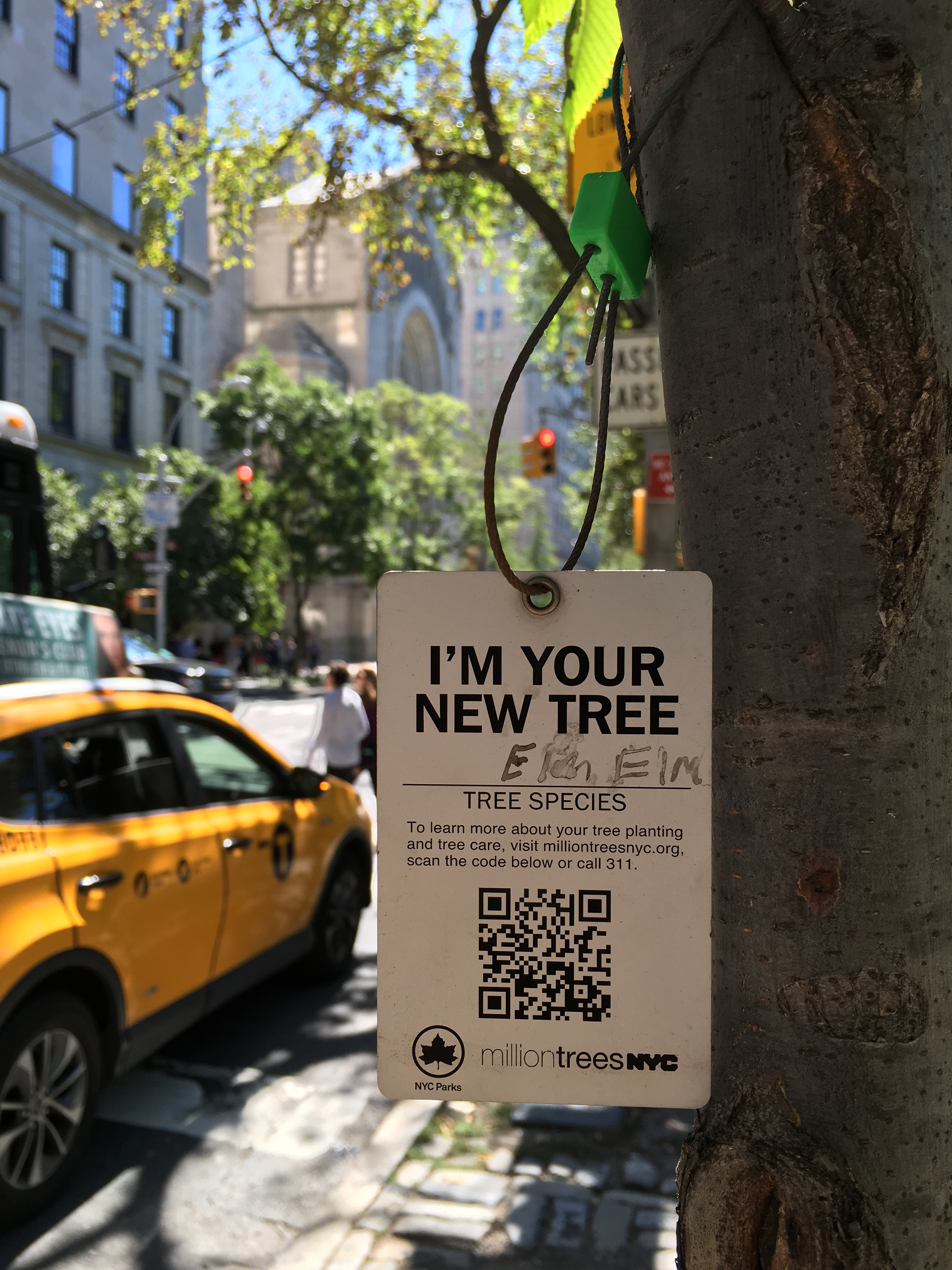
NYC Tree Tag QR Code

On April 22, 2007, Mayor Michael Bloomberg revealed goals of planting one million trees by 2017 as part of PlaNYC, a plan designed for the sustainability of New York City. In the same year, China began its own tree planting program for Shanghai, with the same goal for one million trees. After that, London also began the million tree initiative program in 2011.

== Tree planting: process and maintenance ==
The planning process involves local city governments, NGOs, businesses, and community nonprofit organizations. Environmentalists, ecologists, and urban planners have also contributed to this initiative. The Million Tree Initiative, began with one of the steps of planting trees in local residential areas, urban parks, and other natural areas. The work and maintenance is distributed to people who have agreed to live in those or near those areas to participate by helping and taking care of and maintaining the trees. Many of the materials and necessities for planting the trees are provided by the local governments and involved organizations.

Ongoing monitoring and tracking of the trees' growth and health are crucial to ensure their success. Some programs include regular assessments to measure the initiative's effectiveness. Tree tags with QR codes are used to identify the tree species, contractor, planting dates, deficiencies, and watering events for payment. Trees are also tracked in a GIS mapping system and used by staff to quickly locate and navigate to specifically determined locations as needed. Since the maturity of the trees influences the effectiveness of their purpose, these trees had to be maintained for periods of time so that the goal of the initiative is successful. To guarantee the initiative’s long-term success, ongoing efforts may involve regular maintenance, additional tree planting, and adapting strategies to address changing environmental conditions.

Tree data management and mapping solutions for MillionTreeNYC supplied by Nektar.io of Edmonton Canada.

== Environmental and political impact ==
This Million Tree Initiative is also seen as a display of how the government is progressing to solve urban sustainability, as well as global climate change problems. Local governments such as Los Angeles and New York City, implemented these projects to help reduce carbon emissions, clean air, and fight urban heat islands with mass tree planting. Such programs are inextricably linked with larger environmental objectives like California's climate goals and New York's "PlaNYC," an overarching effort to make the city more resistant to climate effects. They further illustrate the growing political salience of nature-based solutions for urban governance, with city governments playing a major role in global environmental governance. While they face similar challenges of funding and political opposition, they are viewed as small examples of collaboration between local, federal, and private initiatives.

The Million Tree Initiative has also had global effects, and one example is the Paris Agreement, this agreement helps recognize cities that are contributing to global efforts and reducing carbon emissions and footprints. The investment in these trees also helps citices better adapt to rising temperatures, energy conservation, decrease of air and water pollution, and better property values. Some of the socioeconomic benefits of tree planting is that people can come together as a community and improve public spaces and this could even promote green jobs and motivate people to engage more when it comes to climate movements and funds.

== Climate impact and long-term effects ==
The Million Tree Initiative has also significantly impacted the climate in many ways. One way is through a process in which trees perform an act known as a carbon sink. This process happens when a tree absorbs the carbon dioxide from the atmosphere and stores it into their biomass. The trees have also been known to reduce heat emissions and are a useful cooling source. The shade from the trees and the reduced temperature both reduced over 100,000 megawatt-hours in many neighborhood locations for many years. These improved changes have also helped decrease over 100,000 tons of avoided carbon emissions.

Not only do the trees improve air quality through the photosynthesis process, but studies have shown that in just about a year, a mature tree can absorb half a metric ton of carbon dioxide. The health of the ecosystem can also be improved. This is because by planting more trees, a biodiversity of the type of trees used can be increased and the survival rate of wildlife can increase due to a wider range of habitat and improved climate quality.
