= Branch collar =

German term: a part of a tree

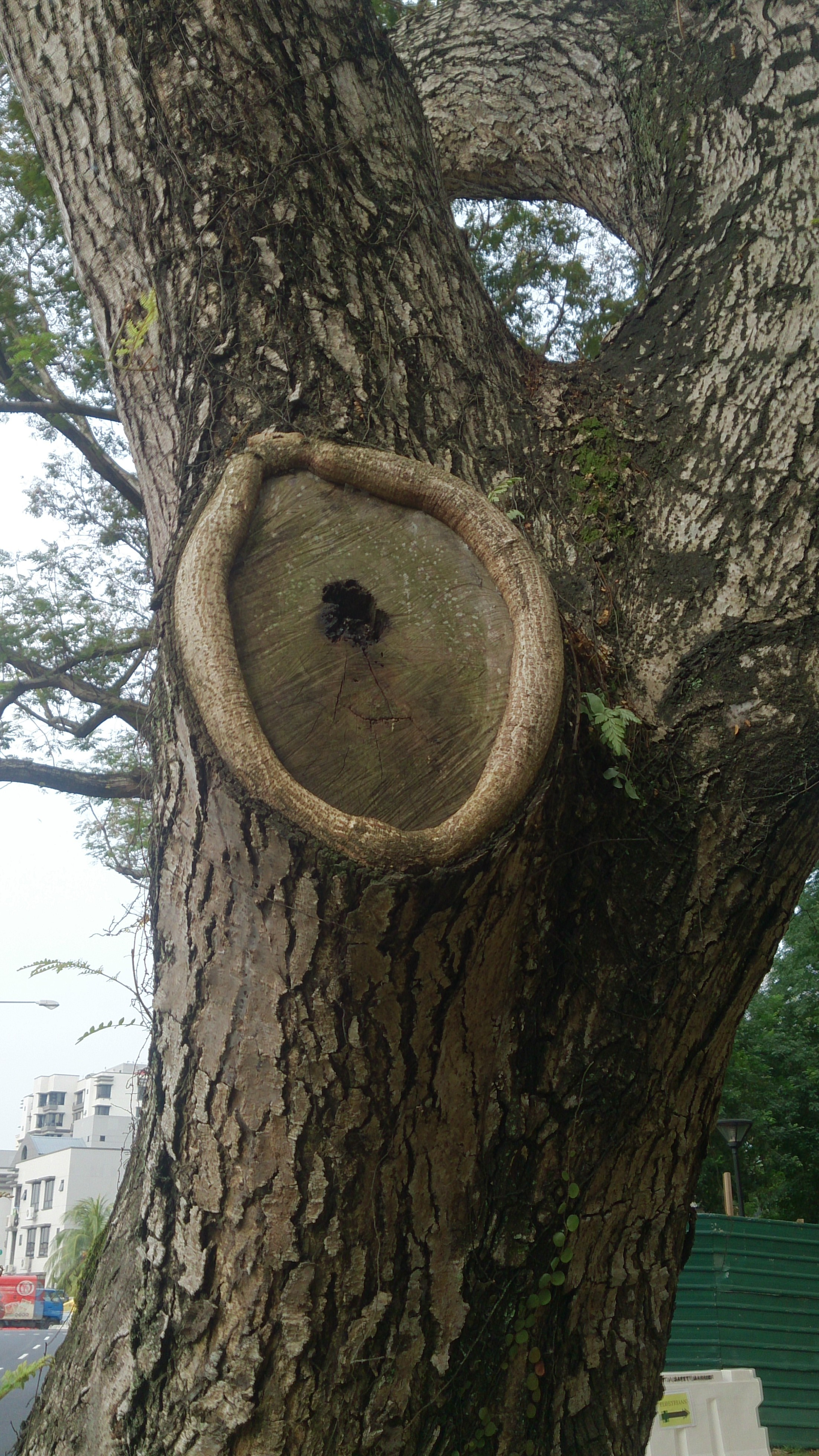
Branch collar around a cut tree branch

A branch collar is the "shoulder" between the branch and trunk of woody plants; the inflammation formed at the base of the branch is caused by annually overlapping trunk tissue. The shape of the branch collar is due to two separate growth patterns: initially the branch grows basipetally, followed by seasonal trunk growth which envelops the branch.

The branch collar serves as a strong foundation to the branch, and its orientation and internal characteristics allow the branch to withstand stress from numerous directions. Functionally, it also influences the conductivity of nutrients and growth patterns.

The branch collar provides a protective barrier to prevent infection and decay, and can also be useful in diagnosing bacterial diseases.

Proper pruning techniques should accommodate for the branch collar structure, as by damaging the tree it is likely to decay or become diseased.

== Definition ==
In arboriculture, the "shoulder" junction structure between the branch and the trunk is known as the branch collar. This structure can be identified as a raised ring of tissue around the base of the branch The branch collar and trunk collar are collectively called the branch collar.

== Morphology ==
=== Growth stages ===
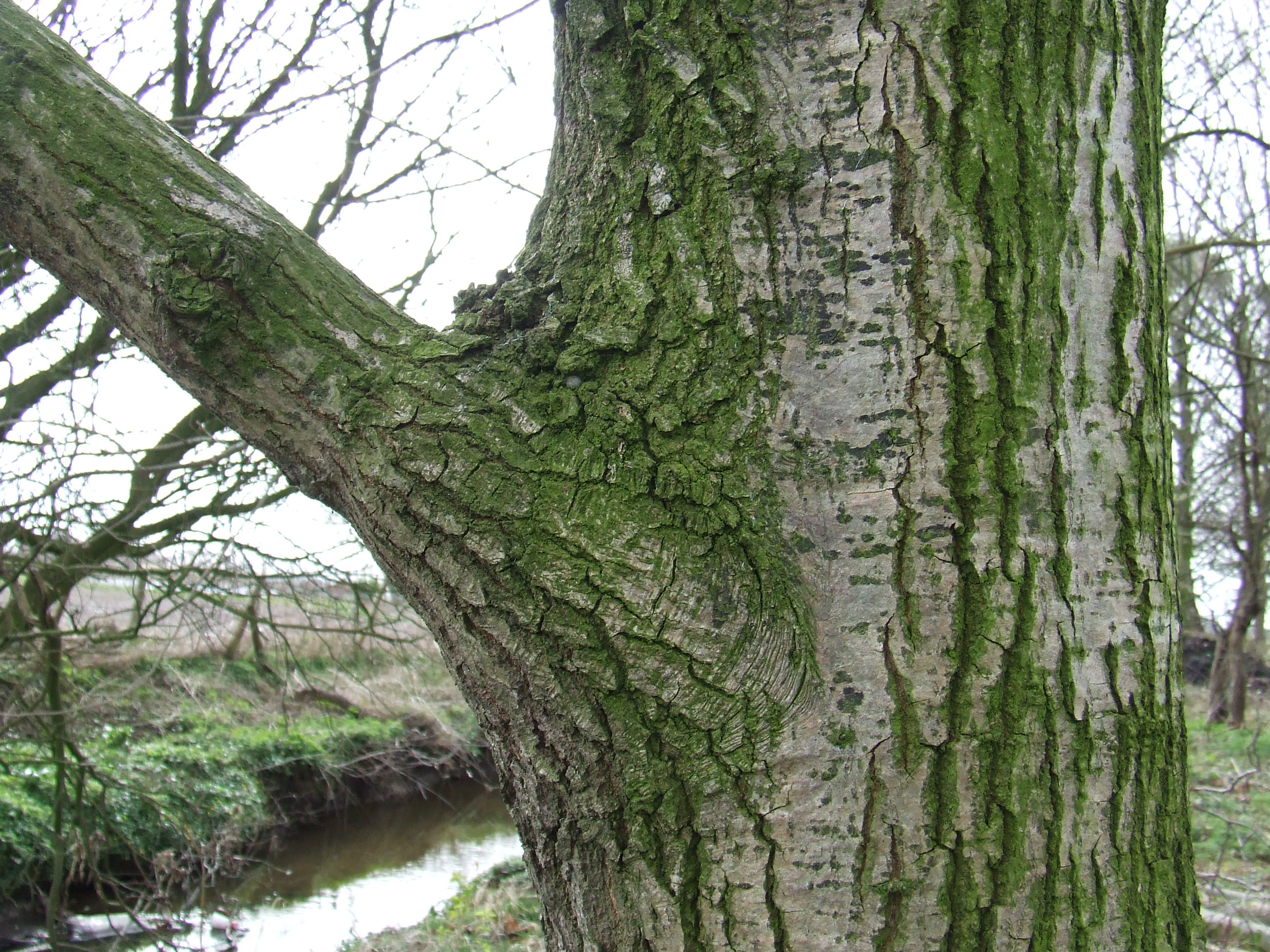
A branch collar on a common oak (Quercus robur L.)

Tree branches are attached to the trunk with a series of trunk collars that annually envelope the branch collar. The branch tissues develop a basal collar first in spring, then trunk tissue envelops the collar later during seasons of growth. This rhythm of growth results in a tissue arrangement that wraps around the branch, creating the branch collar. This processes where the branch tissue develops basipetally and the trunk tissue develops perpendicular to the branch, results in the cambium cells of the upper segments of the branch collar to develop in a right-angle formation.

The expanding cambium of the trunk, over time, slowly overtakes the newly forming branch tissue, which causes the branch collar to swallow up more of the branch as the tree grows. The development of xylem tissue within the tight pocket above the branch collar known as the "crotch", causes the cells to be compacted to form the hard zone of connective tissue between the branch and the trunk. The formation of narrow channels and loops within the branch collar tissue are the pathways left behind by the flowing of large volumes of hormonal signals.

== Function ==
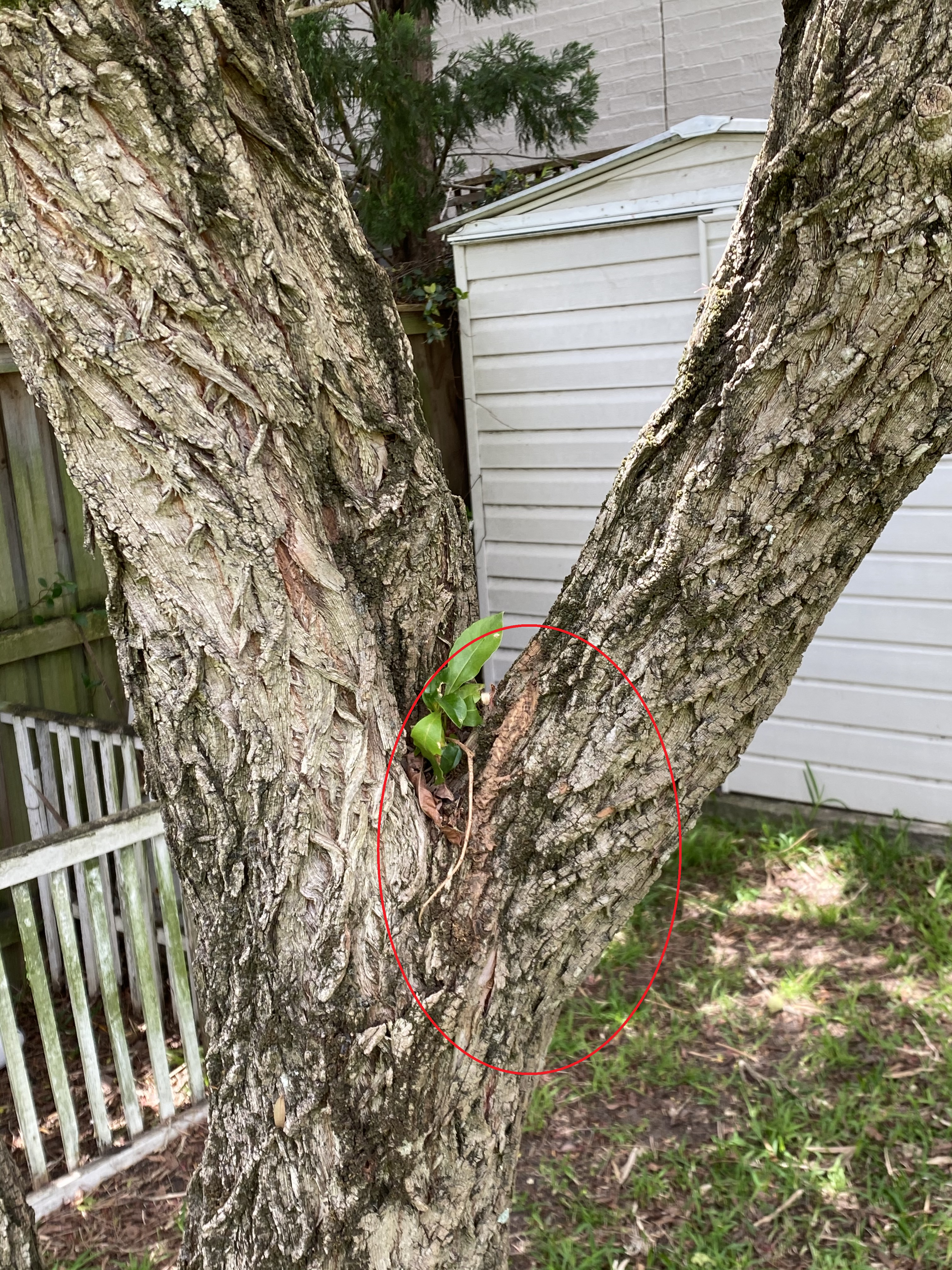
A bottlebrush (Callistemon) with its branch collar circled in red

=== Structural integrity ===
The branch collar forms a sturdy foundation structure, the enveloping of branch tissue by trunk tissue gives the branch unique properties of strength. The branch collar junction due to various regions of differing elasticity allows the branch collar to withstand mechanical loads by distributing stress within tissue regions of varying strengths. Additionally, the orientation of fibres within critical regions of the branch collar can change their physical orientation to withstand and match stress from various directions. Furthermore, microfibril angles and density are adapted locally within the branch and branch collar, to develop patterns within the branch collar that best protect the plant from stress damage caused by loads on the branch and tension from branch growth. The points on the branch closest to the branch collar structure can take the most duress, similarly the branch collar provides the length of the branch with a strong foundation.

=== Low conductivity ===
The presence of visible branch collars is a good indicator of low branch junction conductivity, this is because branch collars with perpendicular branches have significantly lower hydraulic conductivities than more upright branches. Within the branch collar there are water flow restriction zones, which are the combination of narrow vascular elements and non-functional circular vessels these structures help enhance the segmentation of the plant and promotes the movement of water and sap up the central xylem.

=== Influence on growth patterns ===
The circular tissues within the branch junctions directly influence the growth and dimensions of the tree, by affecting the shedding of branches and by attenuating their ability to withstand mechanical load, and indirectly, by affecting the movement of growth regulators and ascent of sap, which influence the development of branches especially the dominance of the leader branch.

Trees can also self-prune by the bark building a ring notch at the branch collar which becomes a weak point so that at some stage the branch will be knocked off. Then the bark then grows over the wound and seals the tree. This function allows plants such as the crack willow (Salix Fragilis) to perform vegetative propagation where the shed branch will then root itself and grow.

== Ecology and disease ==
=== Compartmentalising disease ===
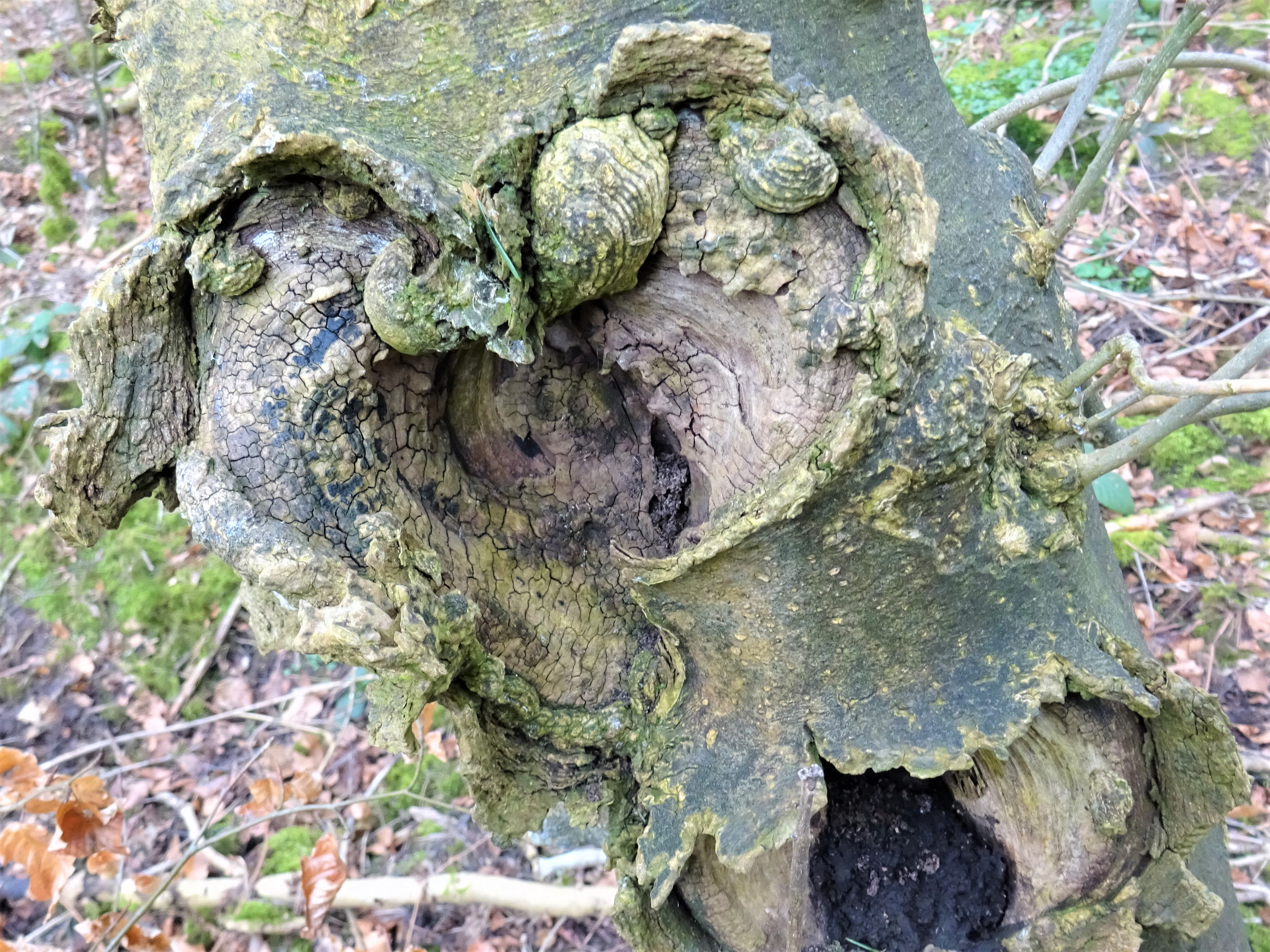
Sycamore Canker caused by Pseudomonas bacteria. Lambroughton Woods, North Ayrshire

The branch collar inhibits infection by acting as a protective barrier.

Trees compartmentalize their injury by producing antimicrobial substances then growing over the area.

Events such as storms or incorrect pruning activity can cause damage to the branch collar When the trunk collar is injured, the trunk xylem below it is rapidly infected and decays. Within the branch collar there is a narrow cone of cells known as the branch defence zone, these cells activate the development of wood wound which is a callus tissue that grows when the branch is broken off.

Suberization followed by periderm formation may provide a barrier to further mycelial advance, and the abundant production of resin may constitute further protection. However periderm barriers can be penetrated by hyphae, especially in weather favouring the rapid extension of canker, and it is common to find a succession of such barriers which have been crossed by fungus.

=== Epidemiology using the branch collar ===
The branch collar can be used to diagnose dying trees, Liberibacter asiaticus bacteria was found in higher concentration in the branch collar than the pith. Branch collar cortical tissue is soft compared to other tissues used for bacterial measure like the pith, making the tissue of the branch collar easier and more efficient in the epidemiological diagnosis of infected trees. Furthermore, the ability to conduct an epidemiological study using branch collar is useful as it can be used instead of leaves, which allows for the diagnosing of trees without any leaves.

=== Canker diseases ===
While most infections occur commonly at the main branch crotches, cankers start at the branch collar. For young trees branches crotch and collar could confine the infection within itself, in older trees (older than 4 years of age) there were more stem cankers which frequently originated on pruning scars. Wounds infection of the stem also originated in wounds caused by large wildlife. Proper pruning techniques of the branches can prevent the development of cankers.

== Pruning ==
=== Guidelines ===
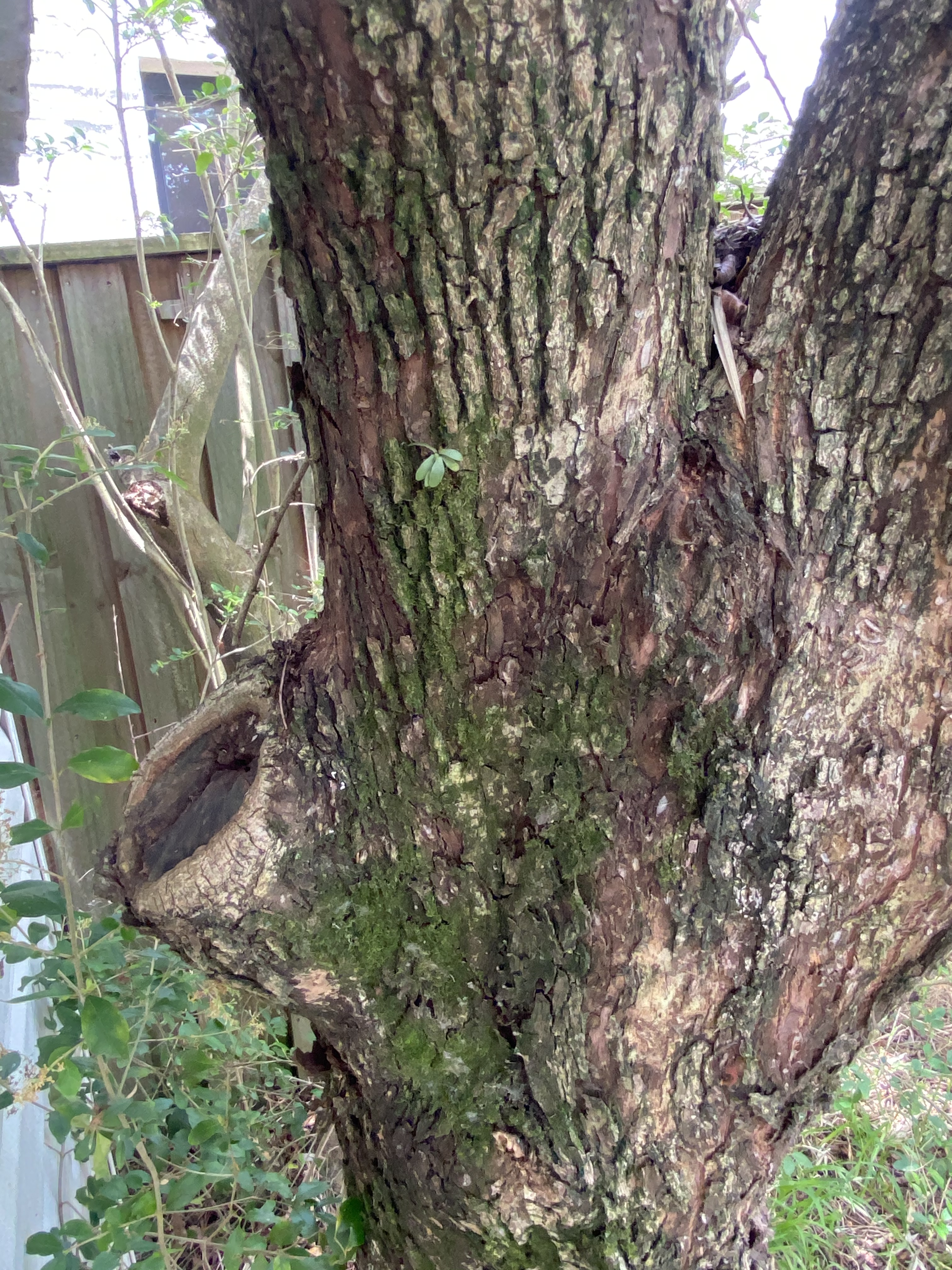
Branch collar that has been pruned correctly.

The generally accepted guideline for urban pruning has been a technique commonly referred to as "natural target pruning". Natural target pruning aims to retain the branch collar on the primary trunk while removing the rest of the branch, thereby promoting the development of the wood wound callus tissue free of defects and therefore possessing greater wood strength. Furthermore, Natural target pruning recommended guidelines aiming to retain the integrity of the branch collar has been shown to facilitate effective wound closure. The traditional method of pruning branches was to make an even level cut against the tree trunk, but this technique is currently avoided as evidence has shown that flush cuts increase the wound size and encourage the invasion of the wound by microorganisms and decay. Therefore, the current recommendation encourages that branches should be removed outside the branch collar as this technique facilitates a circular closure around the wound, while flush cuts often result in a distorted closure that exposes the wood to discolouration and decay.

=== Optimal pruning summary ===
Pruning according to the branch collar is integral in maintaining the health of woody plants. When pruning injures or removes the branch collar, the trunk xylem above and below the cut is rapidly infected by the microorganisms inhabiting the wood and decay of the plant occurs.

Optimal pruning is carried out by cutting with respect to the perimeter of the branch collar and cutting adjacent to it. When cutting it is important to use sharp equipment, as any crushing will damage the branch collar.

Young trees should be pruned enough to control the direction of the plants growth and to correct any form of weakness along the branch. The tree should be pruned at its desired height. When pruning choose roughly five to seven main branches and prune the rest.

Older trees need to be pruned more delicately – they are more susceptible to infections. When pruning older trees, prune out dead, weak, diseased and insect-infested branches and also remove low, broken and crossing branches.

The quality of pruning has significant effect on the infection by fungal pathogens, which can consequently cause stem disease.

Pamphlet entitled; How to prune trees, an example of a pruning resource.

Remove damaged, weak diseased, or insect infested growth or small unwanted branches anytime. It is most beneficial to prune prior to the annual period of most rapid growth, which is usually spring. Conversely, pruning when growth is nearly complete for the season tends to retard and stunt growth. The period of growth tends to vary for different trees, but generally; Deciduous trees should be pruned when dormant. Evergreen trees should be pruned before growth in spring. Spring flowering trees should be pruned towards the end of late spring as this tends to be their period of new growth, this can be indicated by the fading of flowers. Summer trees should be pruned before growth in late winter or spring.

=== Pruning methodology ===
The stages in pruning living branches with respect to branch collar:

1. Decide where the branch collar begins and ends

2. Identify the branch bark ridge (raised strip of bark at the top of the branch union or crotch that sits above the branch itself connecting to the trunk of the plant.

3. Mark a point outside both the branch bark ridge and the branch collar, mark a line angling down away following the angle of the branch collar.

4. Ternary Method; the first cut should be done from the underside of the branch around 6 to 12 inches away from the branch's union to the trunk. This cut is done to prevent the falling weight of the branch from tearing the stem tissue as it pulls away from the tree, which can cause damage and infection.

5. The second cut; called the top cut is made above and is further along the branch than the undercut. As beforementioned it is important to prevent any ripping while cutting and manipulating the branch.

6. Once both these cuts have been completed the branch should fall and be removed.

7. Make a third and final cut outside the previously marked point, at a 45 to 60 degree angle to the branch ridge, while cutting do so in a precise manner as to maintain the structurally integrity of the branch collar (in step 3).

=== Consequences of optimal pruning ===
Proper pruning techniques are integral in keeping the tree healthy.

The branch collar has a variety of functions one of which is a natural defence system from disease and infection. Therefore, proper pruning techniques by maintaining the structurally integrity of the branch collar, allows for the branch collar to develop callus tissue which seals of the wound minimizing disease and infection.

=== Application of optimal pruning techniques ===
Studies testing Kuala Lumpur City Hall (DBKL) tree maintenance workers on correct pruning techniques and conditions illustrated a need for improved education of optimal pruning practices. This would be beneficial as a clear understanding of optimal pruning techniques would improve the quality of their roadside tree pruning and consequently the health of the trees and the individuals living in communities with trees situated nearby.

== See also ==
- Arboriculture
- Branch attachment
- Plant morphology
- Tree fork
