= Bark pocket =

Inclusion of bark inside tree wood

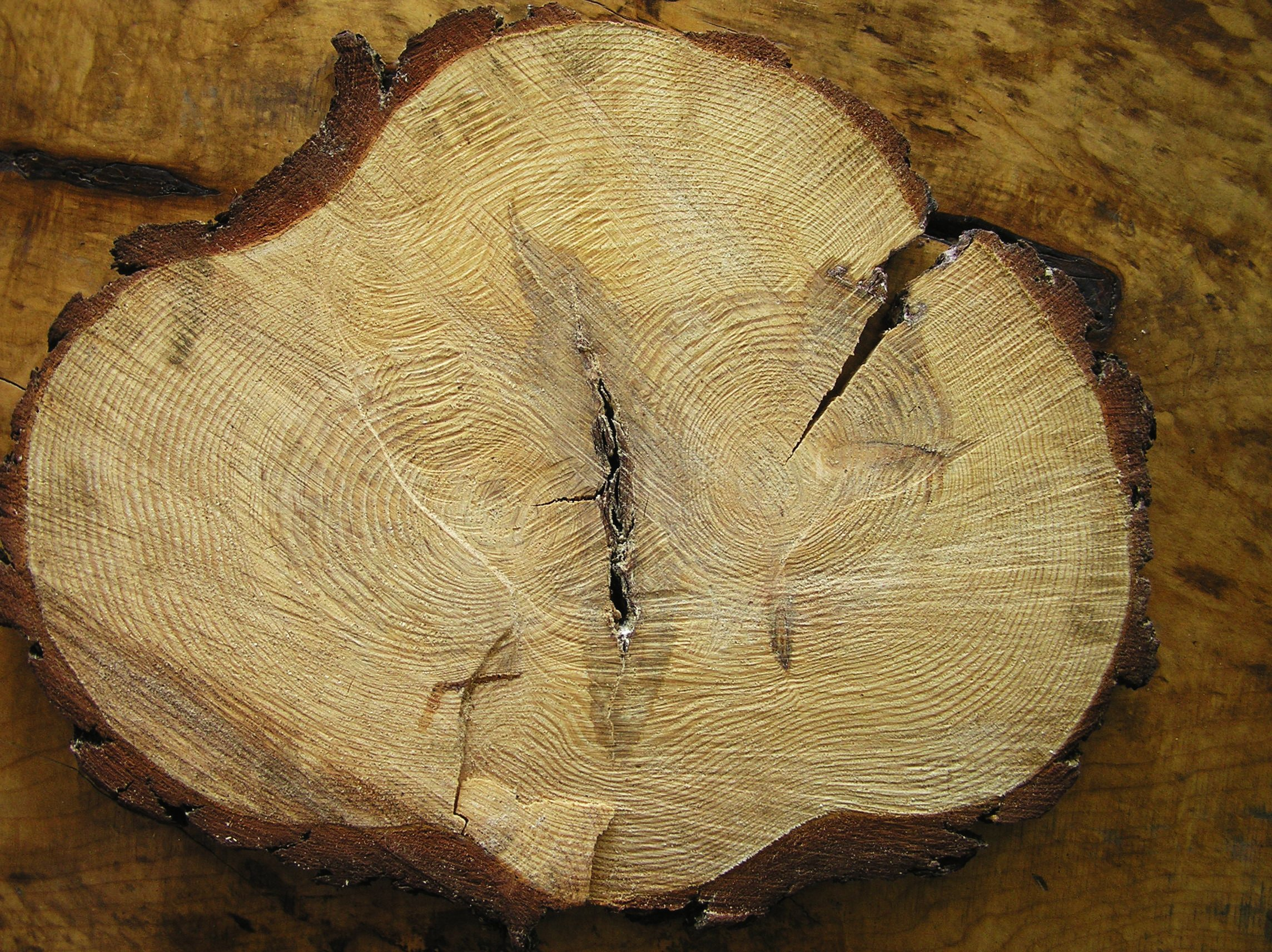
A cross-section of a Scots Pine (Pinus sylvestris L.) containing a bark pocket. The two trunks have been inosculated.

Bark pockets are patches or inclusions of bark partially or fully embedded in the wood of a tree. They can also be used as biomonitors. Bark pockets are considered a nuisance in the lumber industry because they are considered a defect, and lower the grade of the wood. Bark pockets can also weaken tree forks, and can result in damage to the junction under stress.

== Formation ==
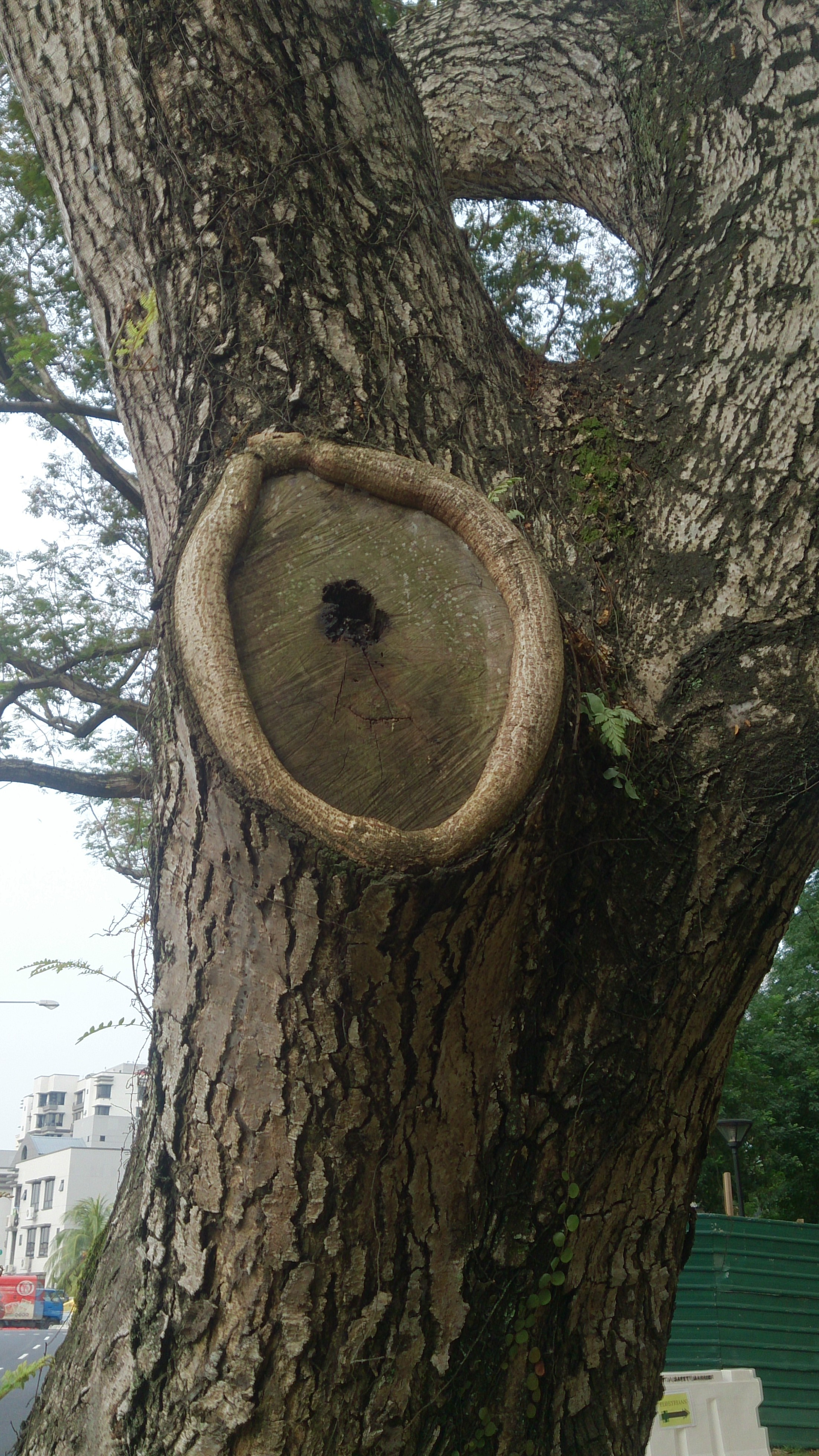
A cut limb in the process of encapsulation.

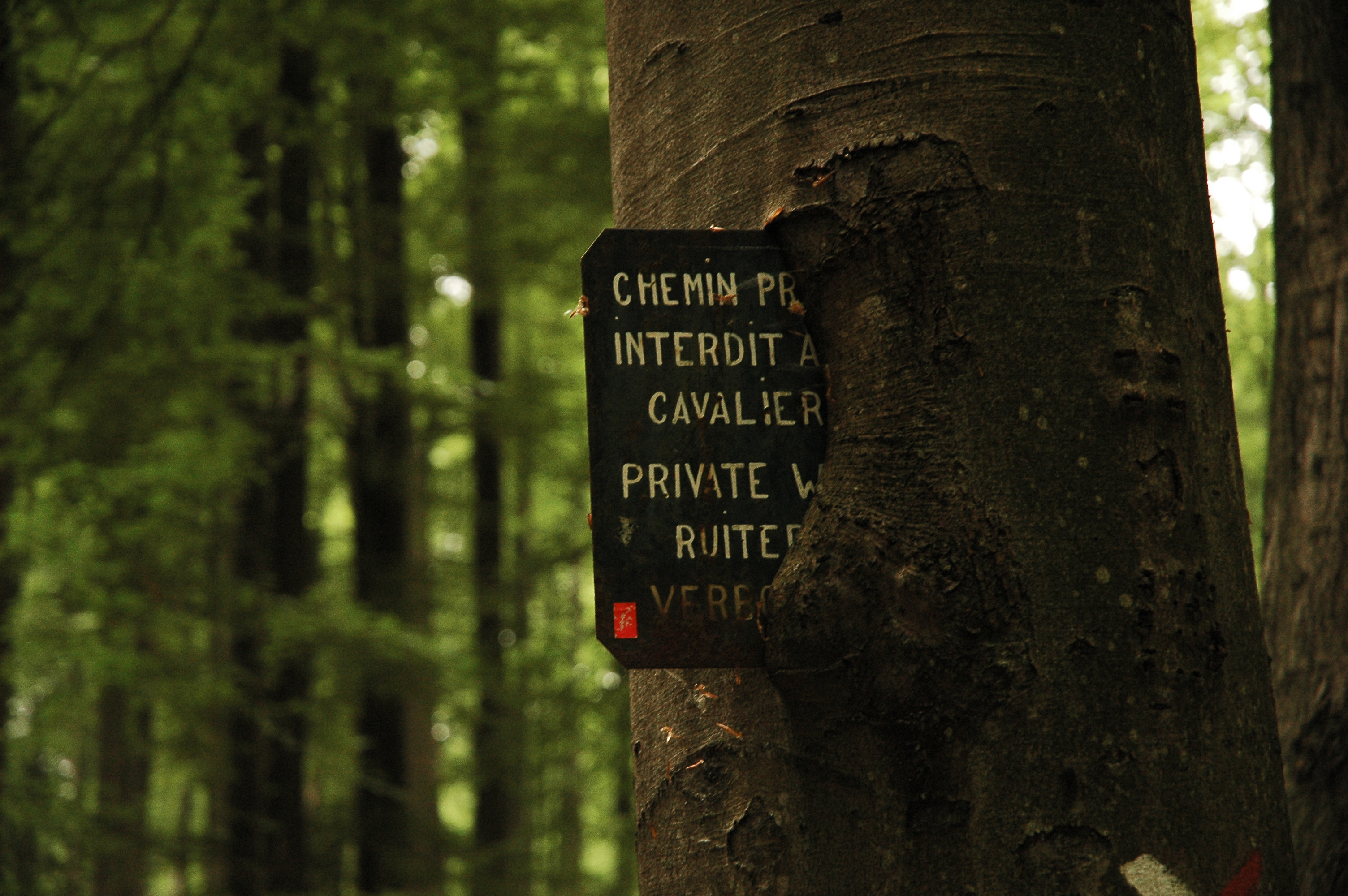
A sign ingrown into a tree trunk.

Bark pockets can be formed by inosculation, formation of a tree fork, encapsulation of a branch, joining together of an uneven trunk, or encapsulation of another object. During inosculation, the bark trapped between the two joining trunk becomes surrounded with wood once the trunks fuse. The resulting bark pocket formed during inosculation or in a tree fork is referred to as included bark.

When a branch is encapsulated, the outer bark on the branch may remain inside the wood of the tree, as the trunk widens and grows around the branch.

== As biomonitors ==
Bark pockets can be used as an indicator of air pollutants during which the time they formed.

They can be used to monitor heavy metals such as lead and copper, as dust or other matter deposited on the bark at the time of formation is still present.

One study analysed the amount of polycyclic aromatic hydrocarbons (PAHs) present in bark pockets as a historical record of air quality, possible due to the interaction between PAHs and lipids in the bark.
