= Tree fork =

Bifurcation in a tree trunk

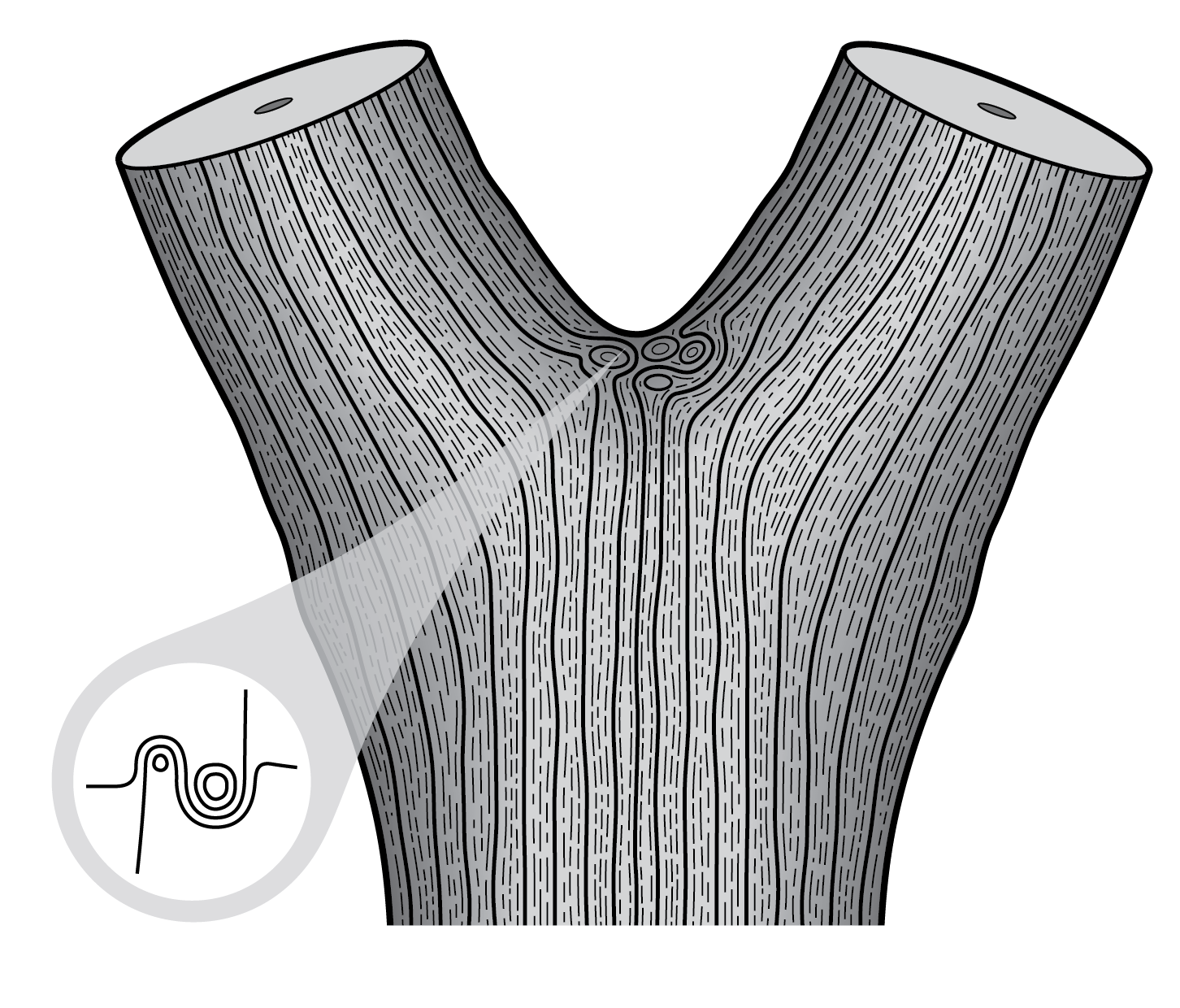
Typical wood grain pattern at a mature tree fork, Slater et al. (2014)

A tree fork is a bifurcation in the trunk of a tree giving rise to two roughly equal diameter branches. These forks are a common feature of tree crowns. The wood grain orientation at the top of a tree fork is such that the wood's grain pattern most often interlocks to provide sufficient mechanical support. A common "malformation" of a tree fork is where bark has formed within the join, often caused by natural bracing occurring higher up in the crown of the tree, and these bark-included junctions often have a heightened risk of failure, especially when bracing branches are pruned out or are shaded out from the tree's crown.

== Definition ==
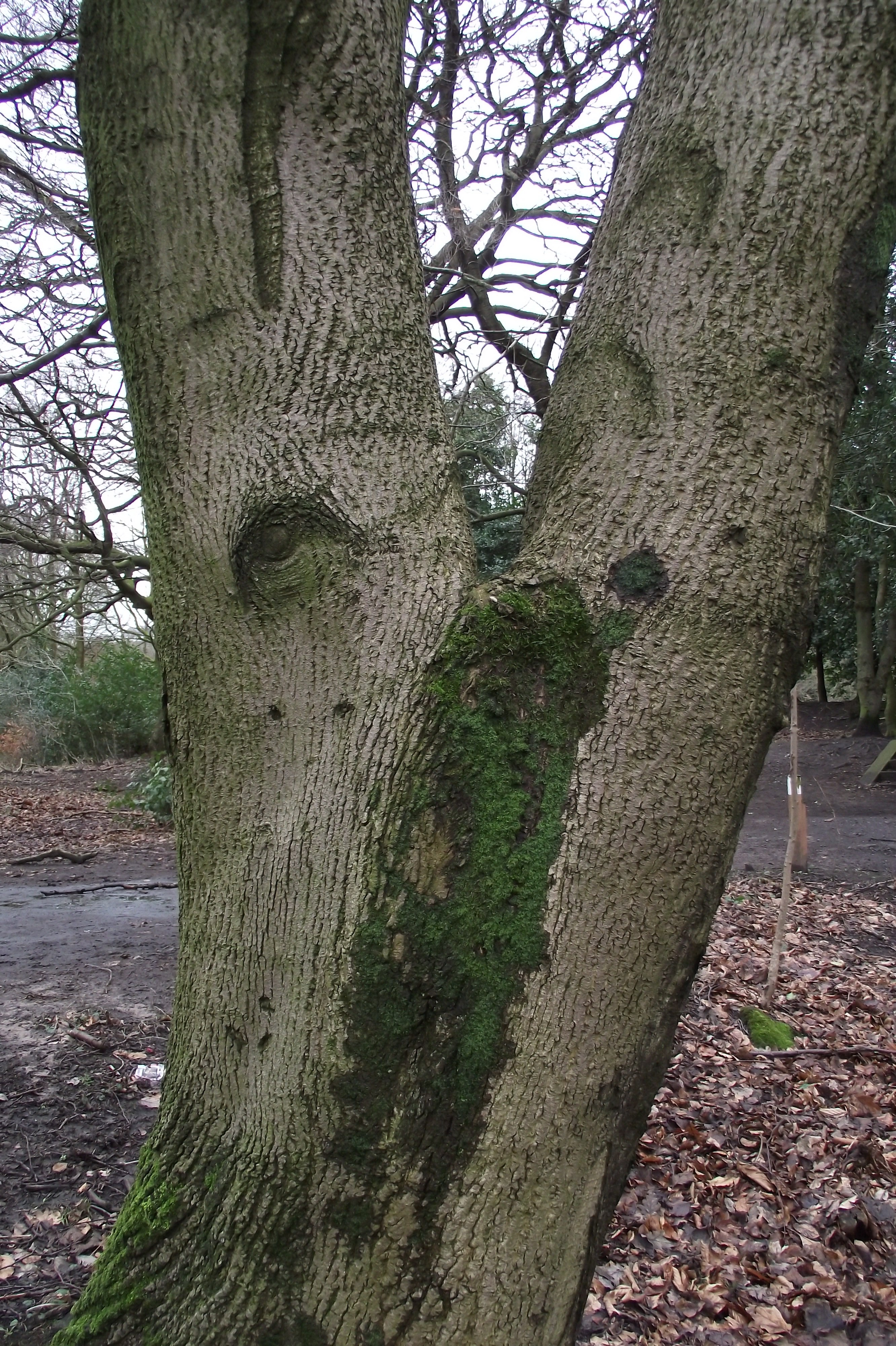
A typical tree fork in a Norway maple (Acer platanoides)

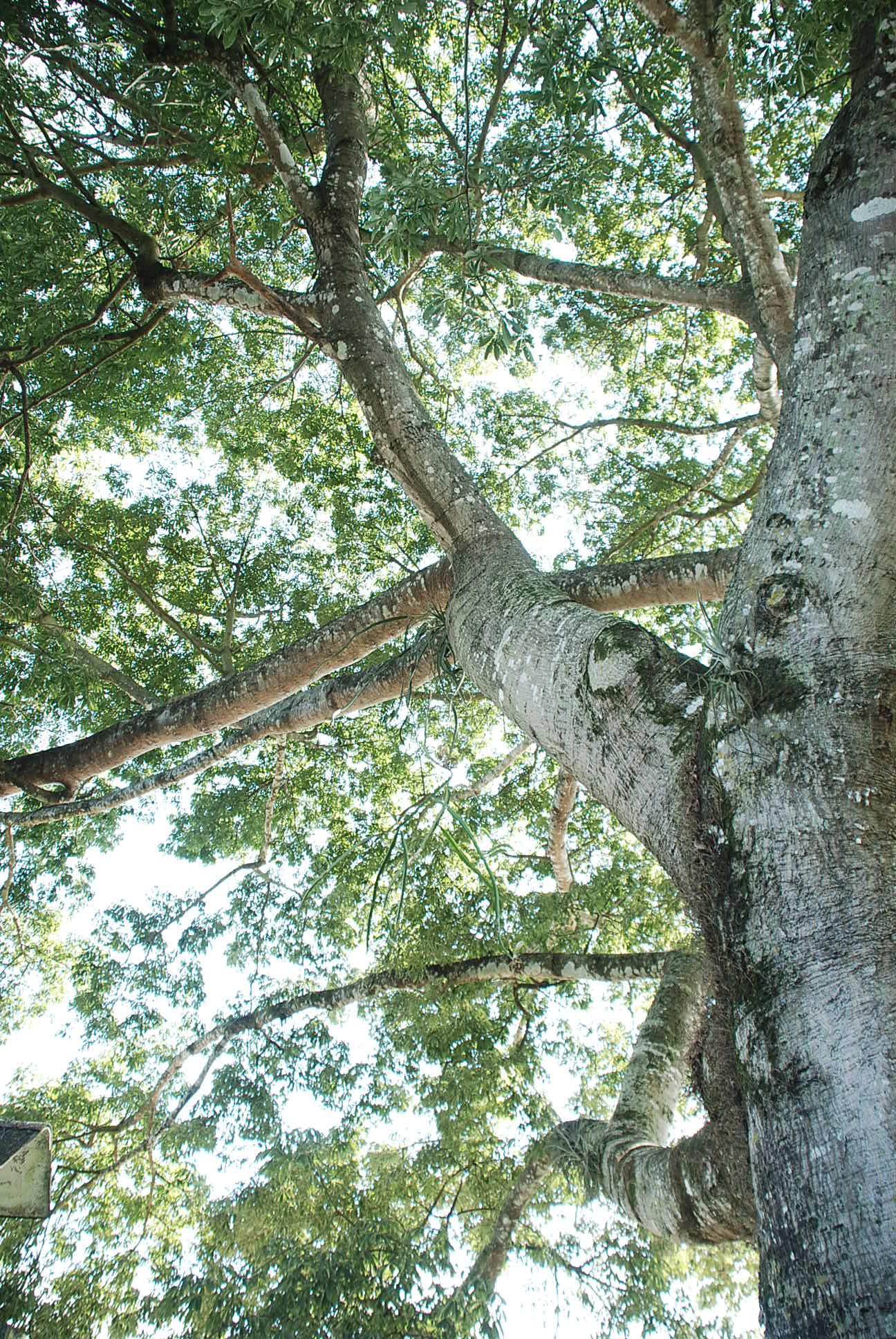
Fork at canopy level in a kapok tree (Ceiba pentandra), colonised by an epiphytic Tillandsia

In arboriculture, junctions in the crown structure of trees are frequently categorised as either branch-to-stem attachments or co-dominant stems. Co-dominant stems are where two or more arising branches emerging from the junction are of near equal diameter and this type of junction in a tree is often referred to in layman's terms as 'a tree fork'.

There is actually no hard botanical division between these two forms of branch junction: they are topologically equivalent, and from their external appearance it is only a matter of the diameter ratio between the branches that are conjoined that separates a tree fork from being a branch-to-stem junction. However, when a small branch joins to a tree trunk there is a knot that can be found to be embedded into the trunk of the tree, which was the initial base of the smaller branch. This is not the case in tree forks, as each branch is roughly equal in size and no substantial tissues from either branch is embedded into the other, so there is no reinforcing knot to supply the mechanical strength to the junction that will be needed to hold the branches aloft. To alleviate potential strain, it is recommended to identify and prune the codominant stem early in a tree's life, while in mature trees, a risk analysis should be conducted to decide whether to remove one stem, cable them together, or leave them intact.

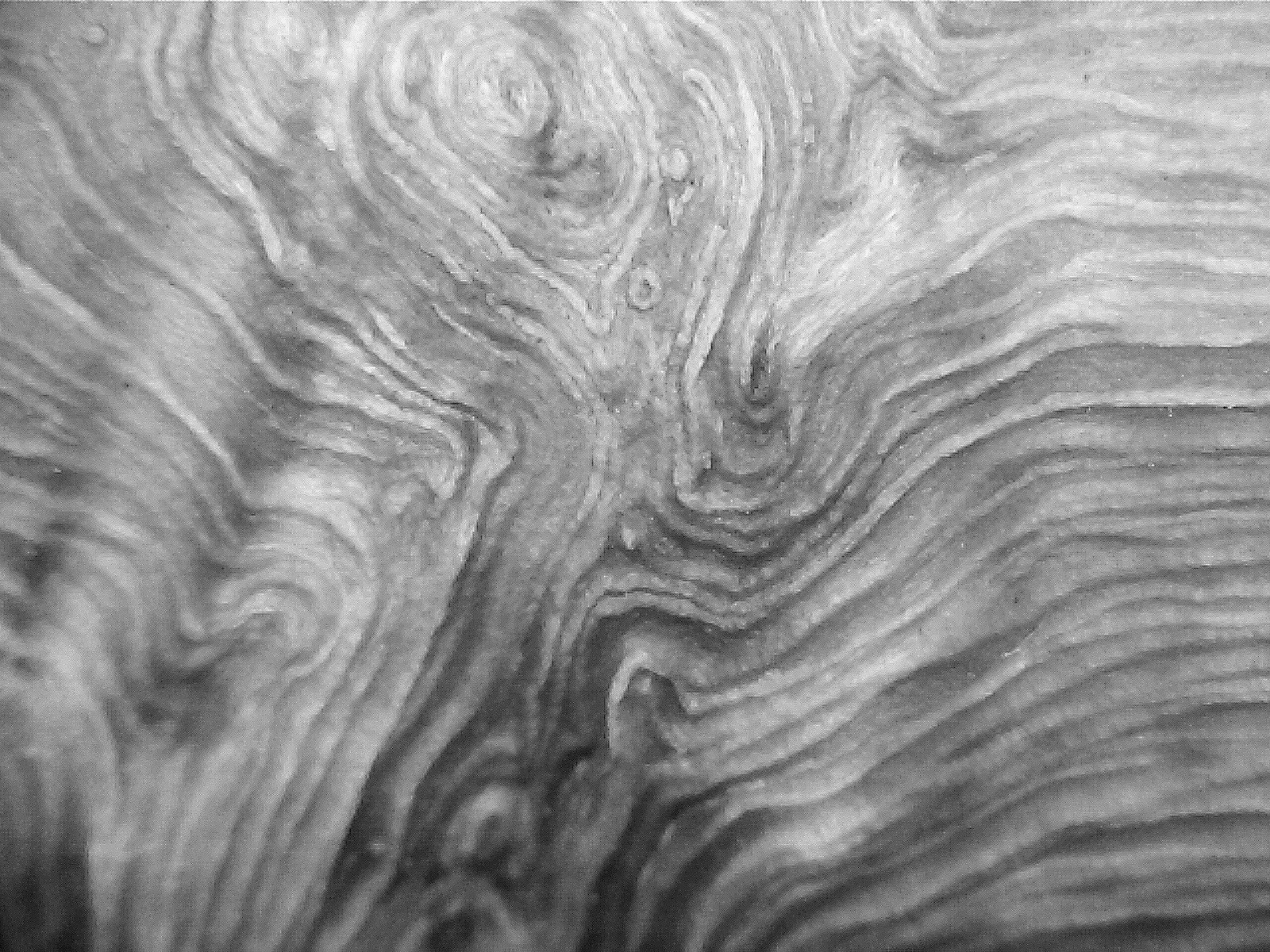
Wood grain pattern of a fork of Fraxinus excelsior (Common ash), as found by stripping off the outer and inner bark layers

== Anatomy and morphology ==
Research has shown that a unique wood grain pattern at the apex of forks in hazel trees (Corylus avellana L.) acts to hold together the branches in this species, and this is probably the case in most other woody plants and trees. This is an example of 'trade-off' in xylem, where mechanical strength to the tree's junction is gained at the expense of efficiency in tree sap conductance by the production of this specialised wood, known as 'axillary wood'. The complex interlocking wood grain patterns developed in axillary wood present a great opportunity for biomimicry (the mimicking of natural biological structures in man-made materials) in fibrous materials, where the production of a Y-shaped or T-shaped component is needed: particularly in such components that may need to act as a conduit for liquids as well as being mechanically strong.

Tree fork morphology has been shown to alter with the angle of inclination of the fork from the vertical axis. As the fork becomes more tilted from the vertical, the branches become more elliptical in cross-section, to adapt to the additional lateral loading upon them, and Buckley, Slater and Ennos (2015) showed that this adaptation resulted in stronger tree forks when the fork was more inclined away from the vertical.

== Bark inclusions and fork strength ==
Where a junction forms in a tree and bark is incorporated into the join, this is referred to as an 'included bark junction' or 'bark inclusion'. A common cause of bark being incorporated into the junction is that the junction is braced by the touching of branches or stems set above that junction (in arboriculture, these branch interactions are termed 'natural braces'). Such included bark junctions can be substantially weaker in strength than normal tree forks, and can become a significant hazard in a tree, particularly when the bracing branches are shaded out or pruned out of the tree. Research has shown that in hazel trees, the more the included bark is occluded within new wood growth, the stronger that junction will be, with the weakest forks being those with a large amount of unoccluded bark at their apex. Common tree care practices are to prune out such bark-included forks at an early stage of the tree's development, to brace the two arising branches above such a junction so that they can not split apart (using a flexible brace) or to reduce the length of the smaller arising branch, so that it is subordinated to the larger branch. Care should be taken not to prune out 'natural braces' set above weak tree forks in mature trees unless that is absolutely necessary.

The strength of a normally-formed tree fork can be assessed by its shape and the presence and location of axillary wood: those that are more U-shaped are typically considerably stronger than those that are V-shaped at their apex. This characteristic, and the presence of bark included in a tree fork, are important attributes for tree surveyors and tree contractors to note in order to assess whether the tree fork is a defect in the structure of a tree.

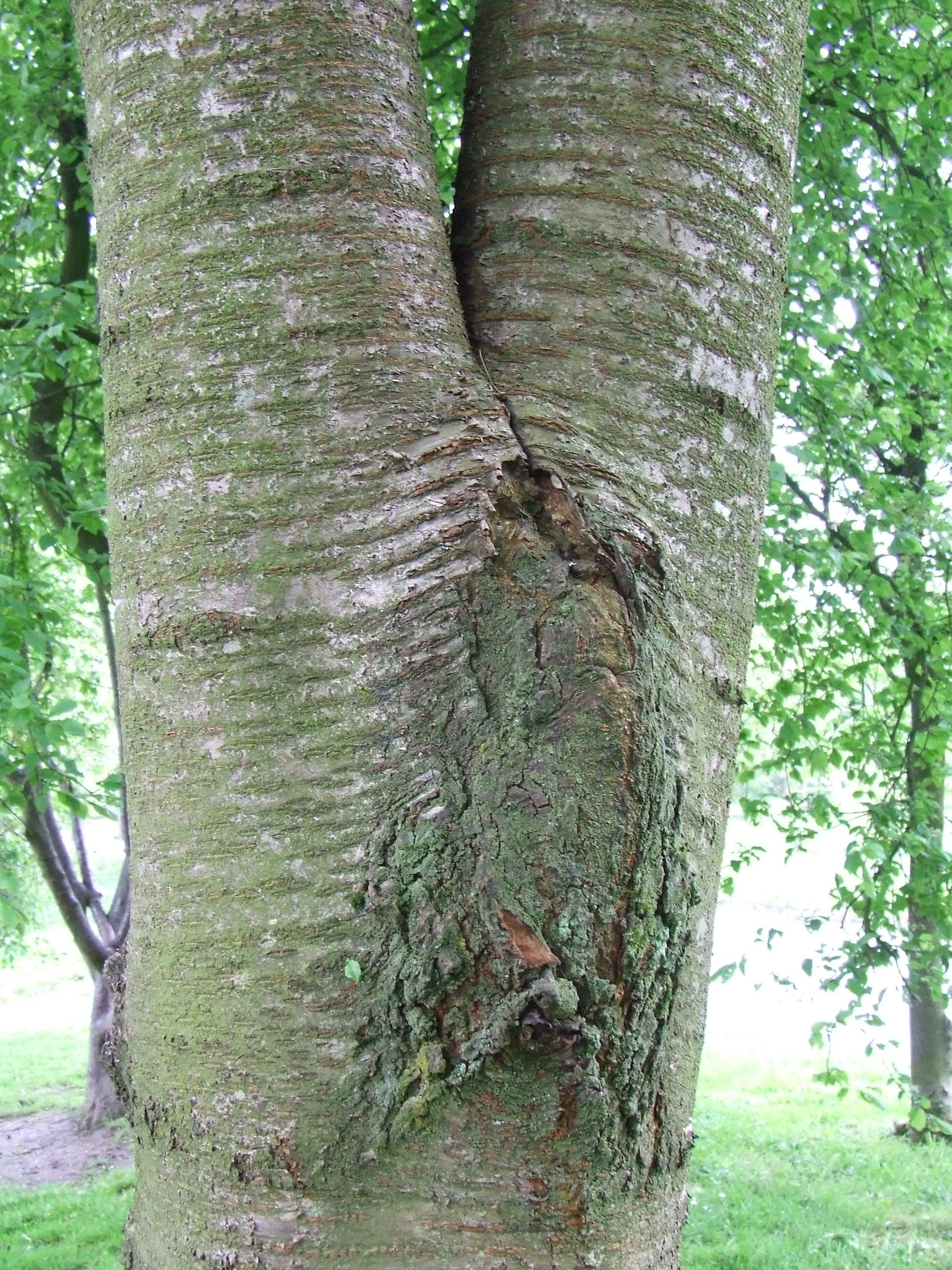
An included bark junction formed in a wild cherry tree (Prunus avium)

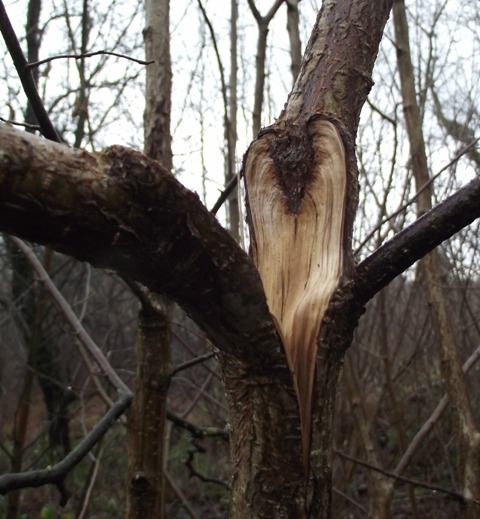
A junction with included bark that failed in storm conditions, growing on a hazel tree (Corylus avellana)

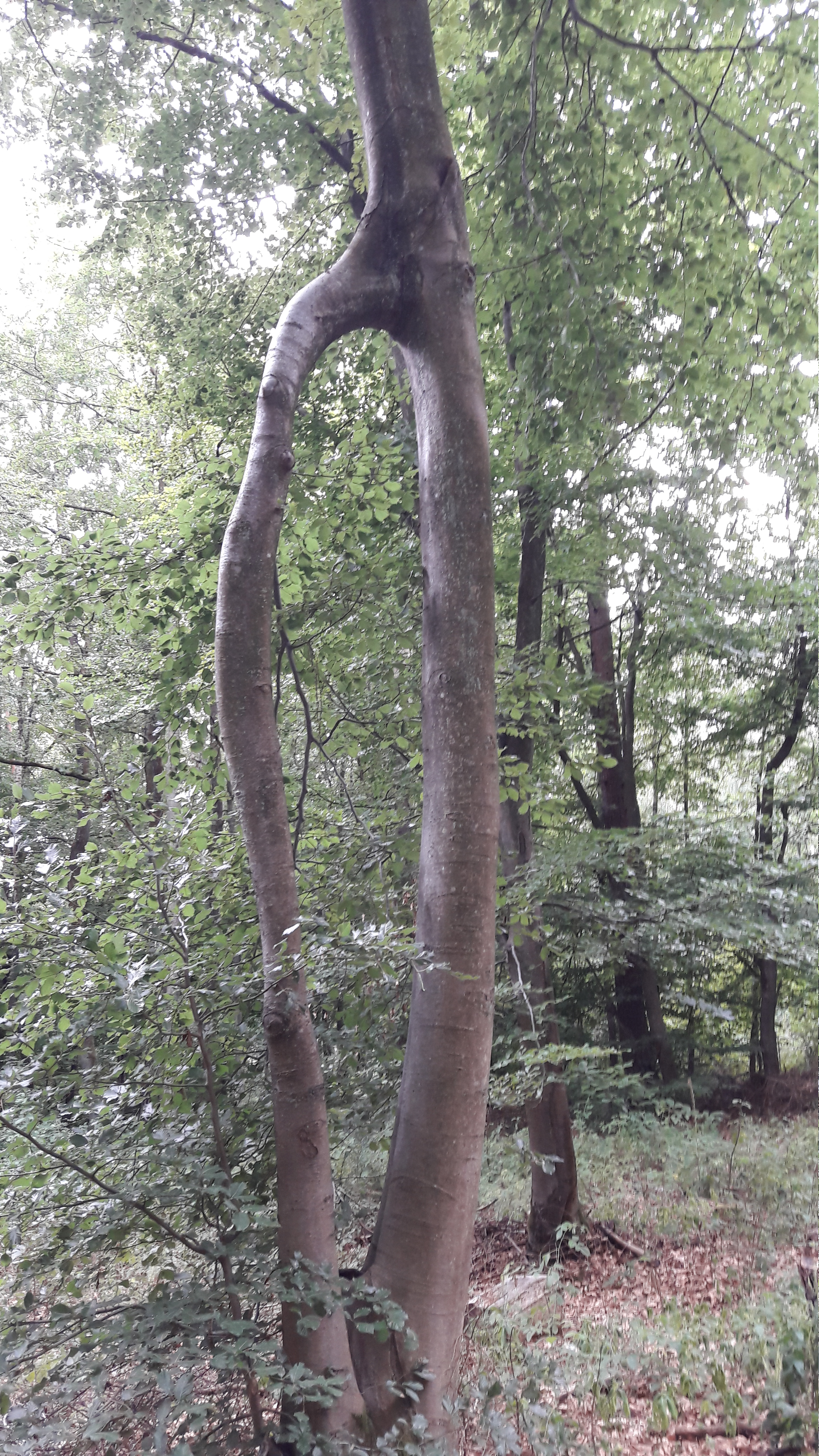
Tree fork, rejoining together again

== See also ==
- Arboriculture
- Biomimicry
- Branch attachment
- Branch collar
- da Vinci branching rule
