= Leaf gap =

Anatomical structure in plants

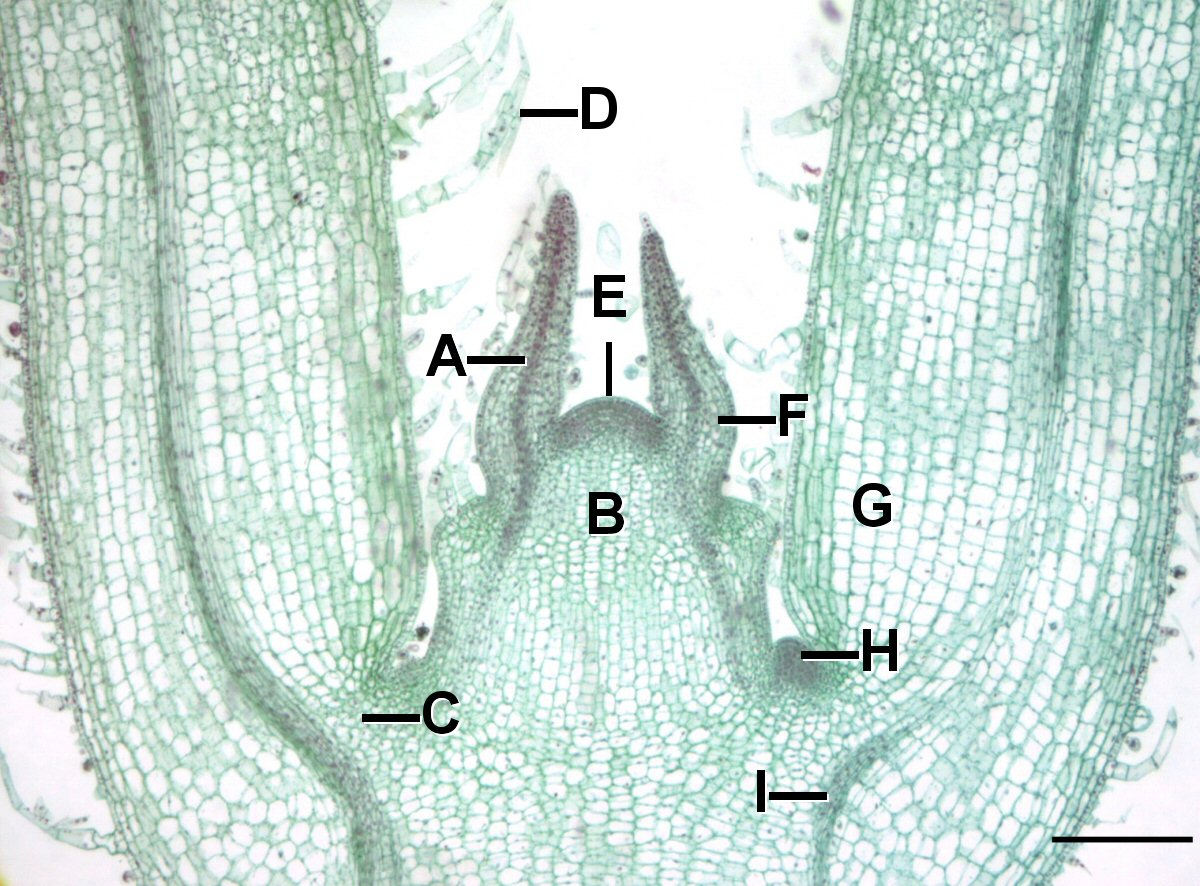
Microscopic view of a stem tip of a Coleus plant, showing leaf gaps (C) and leaf traces (I) of young leaves.

A leaf gap is a space in the stem of a plant through which the leaf grows. The leaf is connected to the stem by the leaf trace, which grows through the leaf gap.

The leaf gap is a break in the vascular tissue of a stem above the point of attachment of a leaf trace. It exists in the nodal region of the stem as a "gap in the continuity of the primary vascular cylinder above the level where a leaf trace diverges toward a leaf. This gap is filled with parenchyma tissue".
