= Branch =

Structural part of trees and plants

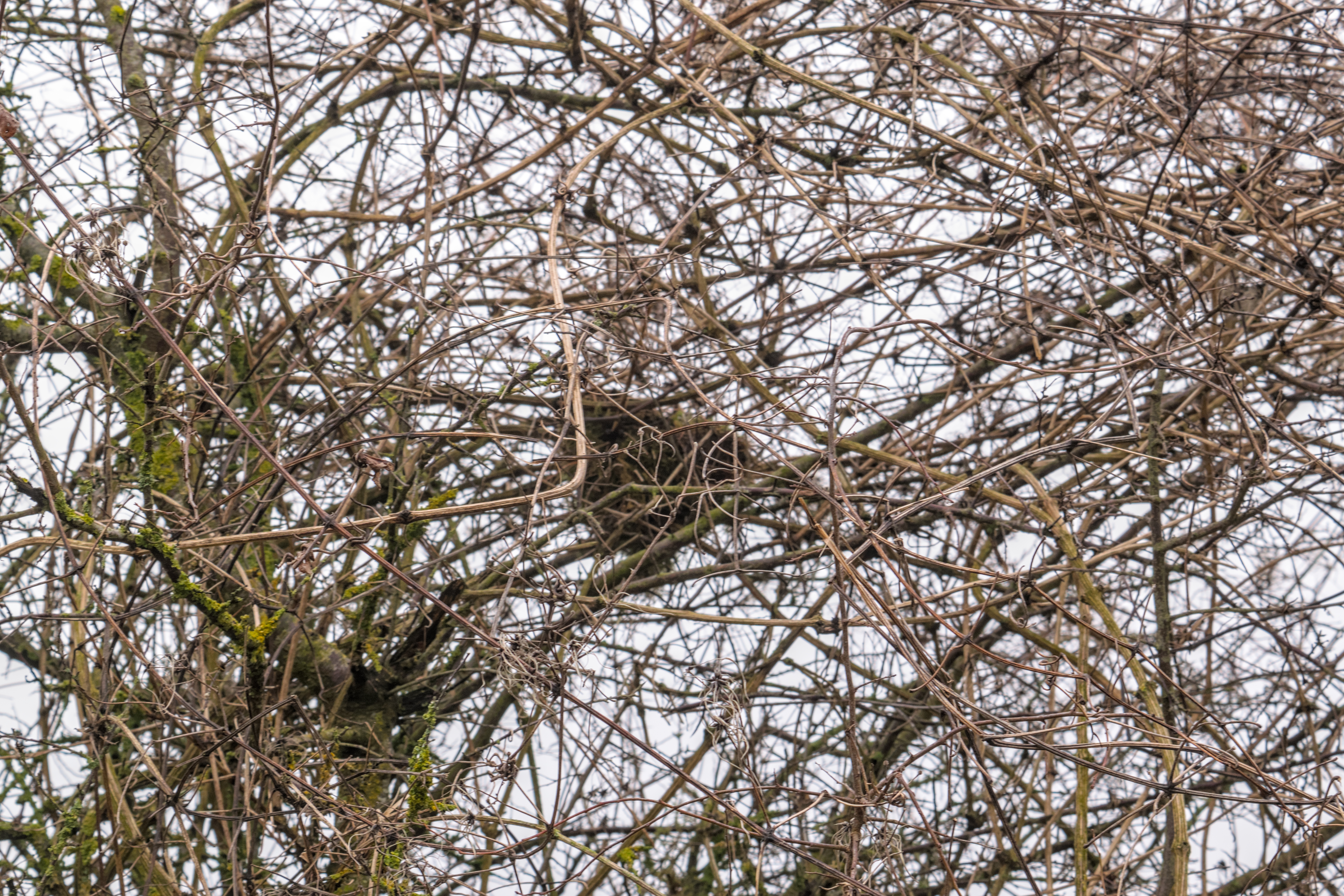
Tree and plants branches of several sizes

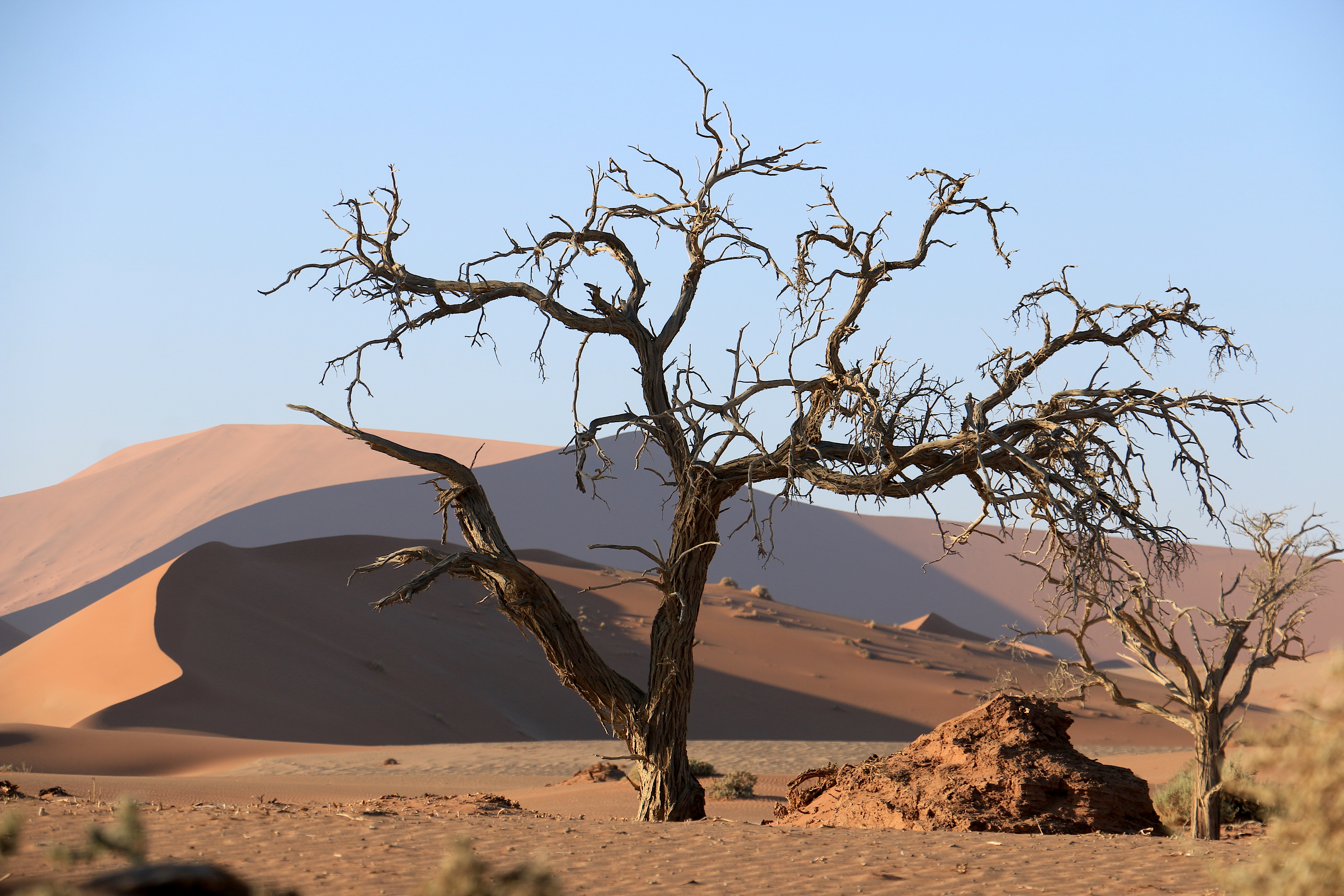
The branches of this dead camel thorn tree within Sossusvlei are clearly visible

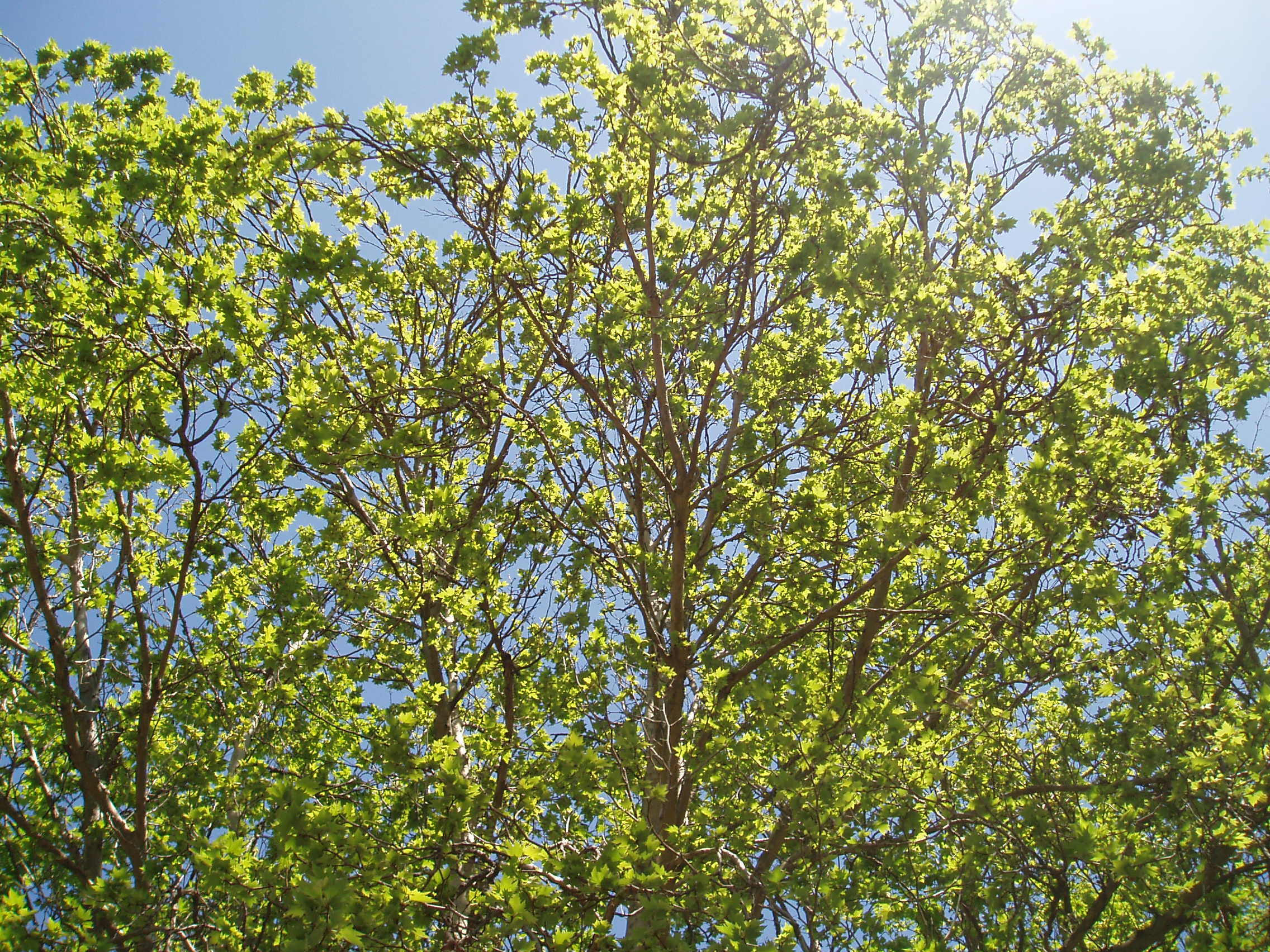
The branches and leaves of a tree

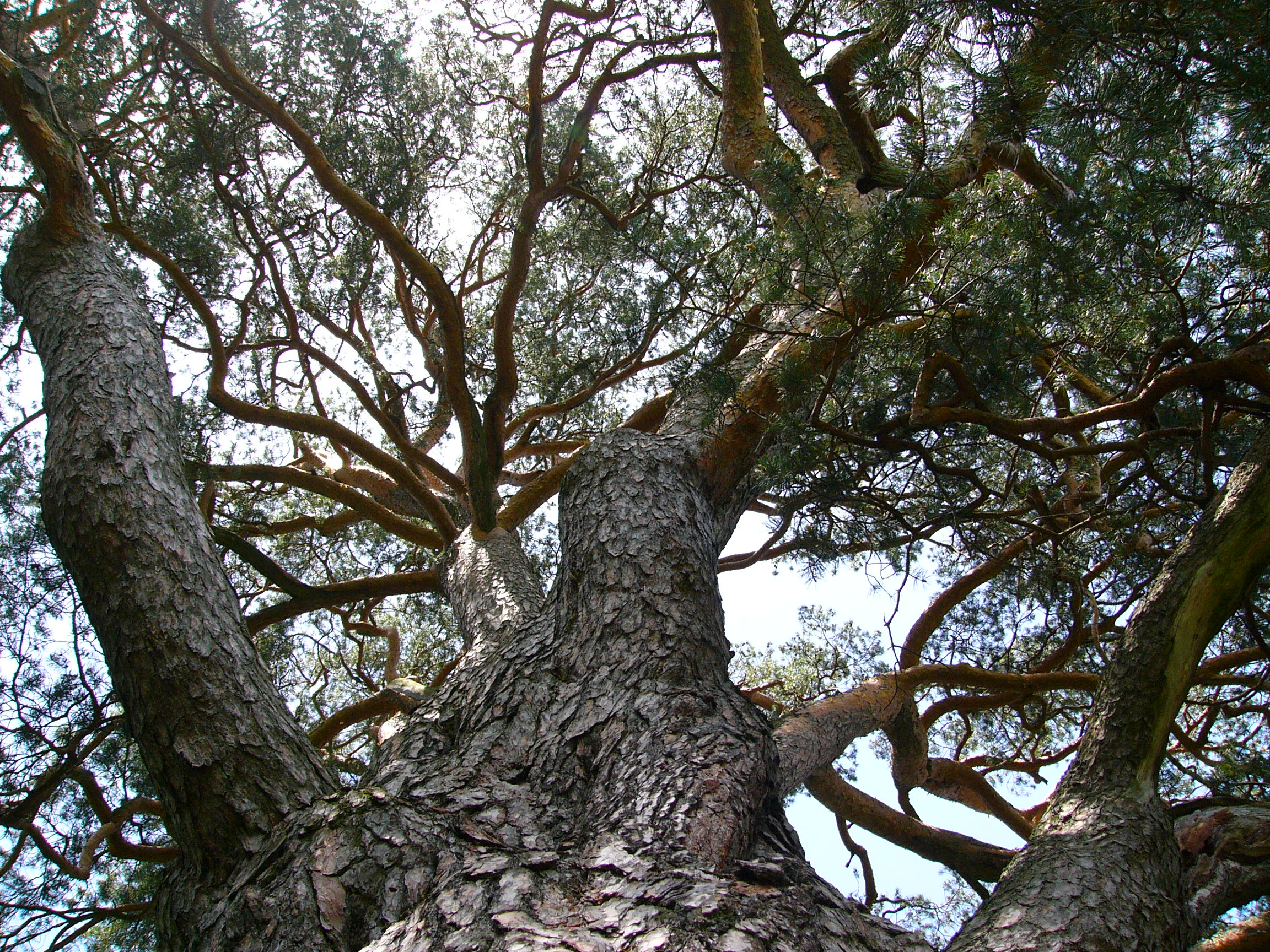
Looking up into the branch structure of a Pinus sylvestris tree

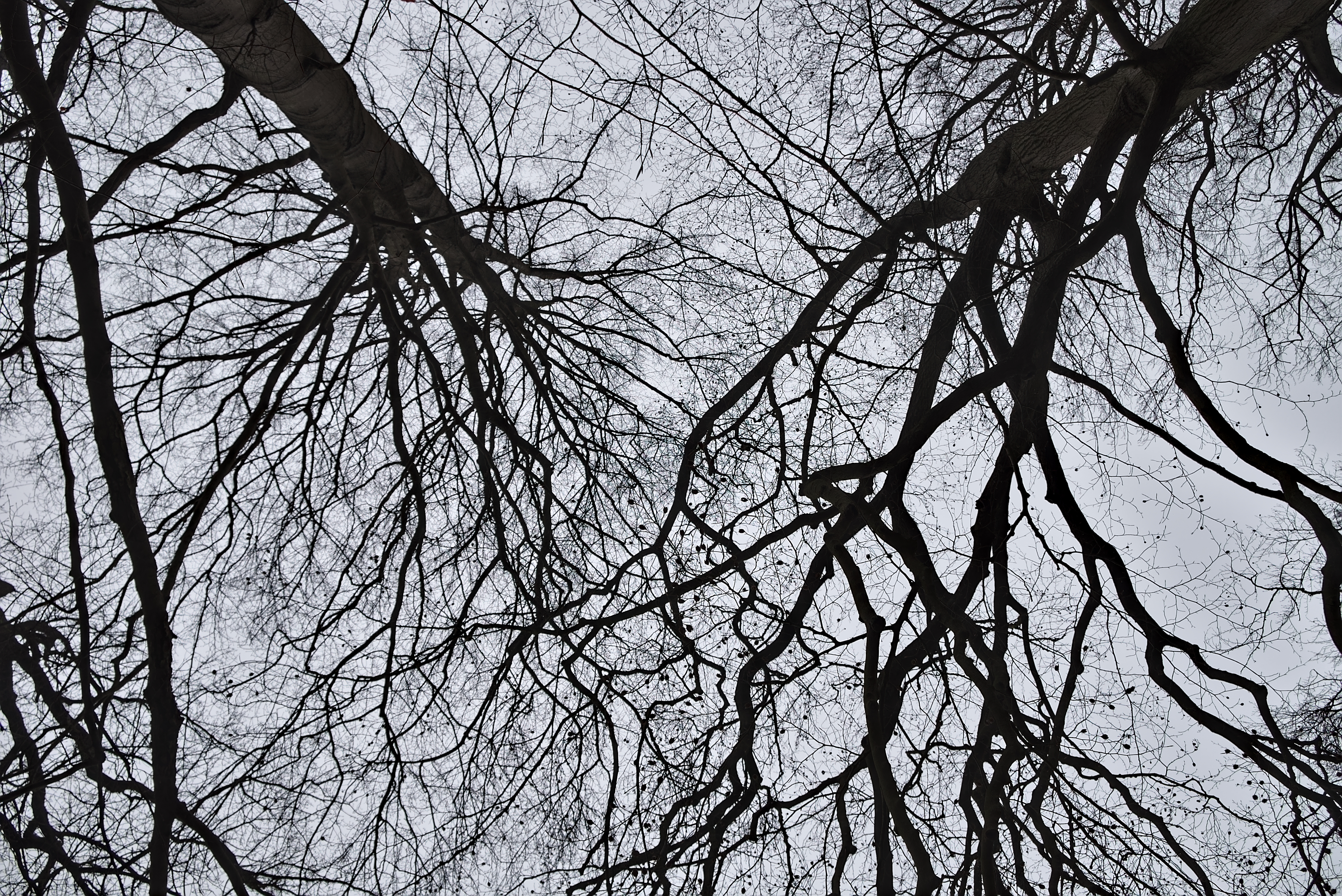
Leafless tree branches during winter

A branch, also called a ramus in botany, is a stem that grows off from another stem, or when structures like veins in leaves are divided into smaller veins.

== History and etymology ==
In Old English, there are numerous words for branch, including seten, stofn, telgor, and hrīs. There are also numerous descriptive words, such as blēd (that is, something that has bled, or 'bloomed', out), bōgincel (literally 'little bough'), ōwæstm (literally 'on growth'), and tūdornes (literally 'offspringing'). Numerous other words for twigs and boughs abound, including tān, which still survives as the -toe in mistletoe.

Latin words for branch are ramus or cladus. The latter term is an affix found in other modern words such as cladodont (prehistoric sharks with branched teeth), cladode (flattened leaf-like branches), or cladogram (a branched diagram showing relations among organisms).

== Woody branches ==
Large branches are known as boughs and small branches are known as twigs. The term twig usually refers to a terminus, while bough refers only to branches coming directly from the trunk.

Due to a broad range of species of trees, branches and twigs can be found in many different shapes and sizes. While branches can be nearly horizontal, vertical, or diagonal, the majority of trees have upwardly diagonal branches. A number of mathematical properties are associated with tree branchings; they are natural examples of fractal patterns in nature, and, as observed by Leonardo da Vinci, their cross-sectional areas closely follow the da Vinci branching rule.

=== Specific terms ===
A bough can also be called a limb or arm, and though these are arguably metaphors, both are widely accepted synonyms for bough. A crotch or fork is an area where a trunk splits into two or more boughs. A twig is frequently referred to as a sprig as well, especially when it has been plucked. Other words for twig include branchlet, spray, and surcle, as well as the technical terms surculus and ramulus. Branches found under larger branches can be called underbranches.

Some branches from specific trees have their own names, such as osiers and withes or withies, which come from willows. Often trees have certain words which, in English, are naturally collocated, such as holly and mistletoe, which usually employ the phrase "sprig of" (as in, a "sprig of mistletoe"). Similarly, the branch of a cherry tree is generally referred to as a "cherry branch", while other such formations (i.e., "acacia branch" or "orange branch") carry no such alliance. A good example of this versatility is oak, which could be referred to as variously an "oak branch", an "oaken branch", a "branch of oak", or the "branch of an oak tree".

Once a branch has been cut or in any other way removed from its source, it is most commonly referred to as a stick, and a stick employed for some purpose (such as walking, spanking, or beating) is often called a rod. Thin, flexible sticks are called switches, wands, shrags, or vimina (singular vimen).

== See also ==
- Basal shoot
- Root
- Shoot
- Stolon
- Turion (botany)
