= Makhniyal =

Pakistani village

Makhniyal مکھنیال
- Village
- Location in Khyber Pakhtunkhwa Location in Pakistan
- Coordinates: 33°49′14″N 73°07′59″E
- Country: Pakistan
- Province: Khyber Pakhtunkhwa
- District: Haripur

Makhniyal (Urdu: مکھنیال) is a village located in the Haripur District of the Khyber Pakhtunkhwa province in Pakistan. It is situated about 15 kilometers southeast of the city of Haripur, and is part of the Khanpur union council. It is located about 30 kilometers from Islamabad.

The village is known for its natural environment and forest area. The Makhniyal Ridge Trail located nearby offers a hike through the Margalla Hills.

== Forest ==
The Makhniyal Forest area is among the three forest ranges that cover a total of 495,265 acres (2,004.27 km^{2}) in the Haripur District. Notably, the inauguration of the Government of Khyber Pakhtunkhwa's Billion Tree Tsunami project took place within the Makhniyal Forest on 21 February 2015 by the symbolized planting of its inaugural sapling by Imran Khan. On 2 September 2018, this location also witnessed the planting of the first sapling for the federal government's Ten Billion Tree Tsunami project.

In recent years, the forest land is under threat from illegal construction activities and tree felling. Official documents in 2021 estimated that about 38.92 acres (15.75 ha) of the forest covered area had been illegally occupied by land developers. Moreover, wildfires have also damaged the natural environment of the area. Nevertheless, endeavors are underway to revive the ecosystem by conducting land surveys.
