= Gut Buchhof =

Coordinates: 49.1189°N 10.2944°E

- Estate
- Location in Bavaria, Germany

Gut Buchhof is an estate belonging to the city of Munich.

It was acquired by the city of Munich, along with Gut Riem, in 1965. In the years 1994 to 1998, extensive renovations of the buildings were carried out. Buchhof Castle, and parts of the estate, have been left under heritable building rights belonging to the Munich International School.
