= Political positions of Imran Khan =

Political views of Imran Khan

Imran Khan is a Pakistani politician, former cricketer, and the founder of Pakistan Tehreek-e-Insaf (PTI), a party he established in 1996. He served as Prime Minister of Pakistan from 2018 to 2022.

Khan's political positions have combined anti-corruption populism, Pakistani nationalism, and appeals to an Islamic welfare state inspired by the model of Medina. Scholars have variously described Khan and PTI as populist, right-wing populist, nationalist, and Islamist-civilisationist.

PTI's 2018 manifesto emphasized the rule of law, meritocracy, decentralisation, social protection, education, healthcare, housing, job creation, and environmental restoration under the slogan of Naya Pakistan. As prime minister, Khan's most prominent domestic initiatives included the Ehsaas Programme, the Sehat Sahulat Program, the Single National Curriculum, and the Ten Billion Tree Tsunami. In foreign policy, he advocated regional connectivity, close relations with China, a negotiated settlement in Afghanistan, a strong stance on Kashmir, and international action against Islamophobia.

== Governance ==
Khan's central political theme has been the replacement of what he described as a corrupt, patronage-based order with rule of law and merit. PTI's 2018 manifesto called for an Islamic welfare state based on justice, equality before law, and accountability, while Khan's wider rhetoric of Naya Pakistan framed corruption as the principal obstacle to development.

=== Anti-corruption and accountability ===
Khan has consistently presented anti-corruption as the core of his politics. He campaigned against Pakistan's established dynastic parties and argued that elite capture, money laundering, and patronage had hollowed out state institutions. PTI's manifesto proposed strengthening the National Accountability Bureau, enhancing the powers of the Auditor General of Pakistan, improving asset recovery, and insulating accountability institutions from political influence.

Khan also linked accountability to civil-service reform and meritocracy, arguing that public office should no longer function as a source of patronage. In this respect, his anti-corruption politics were both institutional and moral, presenting reform as a struggle to restore public virtue as well as state capacity.

=== Decentralisation, transparency and the press ===
PTI's 2018 manifesto pledged stronger local governments, transparent public procurement, wider implementation of right-to-information laws, and publication of budgets and audits in accessible form. Khan argued that empowered local bodies were necessary to break bureaucratic centralisation and improve service delivery.

The same manifesto promised to protect freedom of the press. During Khan's premiership, however, civil-society groups and some scholars said that journalists, opposition voices, and activists faced intimidation, legal pressure, and censorship, leading critics to argue that his government departed from its reformist pledges on civil liberties.

== Social issues ==
=== Religion and the Islamic welfare state ===
Khan has repeatedly argued that Pakistan should become an Islamic welfare state modelled on the ethical principles of the Prophet Muhammad's community in Medina, often using the phrase Riyasat-e-Madina. In PTI's 2018 manifesto, this vision was linked to social justice, redistribution, universal access to health and education, and equal citizenship under the rule of law.

Scholars have argued that religion occupies a central place in Khan's populist discourse, fusing moral reform, civilisational language, and anti-elite politics. In this reading, his politics do not treat religion as a private matter alone, but as a source of legitimacy for state reform and national revival.

=== Blasphemy, minorities and interfaith relations ===
PTI's 2018 manifesto promised protection for the civil, political, social and religious rights of minorities, greater protection for places of worship, and a stronger National Commission for Minorities. In 2020, as prime minister, Khan approved federal funding for the construction of a Hindu temple in Islamabad, a move supporters presented as consistent with minority protection but which drew opposition from religious conservatives.

At the same time, Khan has defended Pakistan's blasphemy laws and opposed changing them, a stance for which he has been criticised by rights advocates and the United States Commission on International Religious Freedom. During the 2018 crisis following the acquittal of Asia Bibi, Khan initially defended the Supreme Court's verdict and warned protesters not to confront the state, but his government later concluded an agreement with Tehreek-e-Labbaik Pakistan to end the unrest.

=== Women's rights ===
PTI's 2018 manifesto pledged greater gender equality in education, employment, property rights, legal protection, and maternal health, and supported stronger enforcement against violence directed at women. Khan has generally framed women's empowerment as part of his wider welfare-state agenda.

His comments on sexual violence have nevertheless been controversial. In 2021 he linked rape to "vulgarity" and lack of modesty, remarks that were widely criticised by women's-rights activists as victim-blaming.

=== Education ===
Education has been a recurring focus of Khan's politics. PTI's 2018 manifesto described Pakistan's education system as unequal and fragmented, pointed to the large number of out-of-school children, and called for increased public investment, curricular reform, and the expansion of technical and vocational training.

As prime minister, Khan championed the Single National Curriculum as a way to narrow the gulf between elite private schools, government schools, and madrasas. The policy was presented by supporters as egalitarian, but it became controversial among critics who argued that it increased religious content and reduced curricular diversity.

=== Healthcare and social protection ===
Khan's social policy in office was most closely associated with the expansion of cash transfers and public health coverage. The Ehsaas Programme, launched under his government in 2019 and expanded during the COVID-19 pandemic, was presented as a national anti-poverty and social-protection framework. The Sehat Sahulat Program was promoted by Khan as a step toward universal health coverage, particularly after its expansion in Punjab and the Islamabad Capital Territory.

These programs were frequently linked by Khan to his idea of an Islamic welfare state in which the government had a direct obligation to protect vulnerable households.

== Economic issues ==
=== Economic philosophy ===
Khan's economic rhetoric has mixed anti-elite populism with support for private-sector growth, export promotion, tax reform, and welfare spending. PTI's 2018 manifesto promised ten million jobs, five million homes, support for small and medium-sized enterprises, and a broad shift from consumption-led growth toward productivity and exports.

He has argued that corruption, tax evasion, and state capture by rent-seeking elites are the chief barriers to development, and that economic reform must be tied to institutional accountability.

=== Taxation, debt, and the IMF ===
After taking office, Khan confronted a balance-of-payments crisis and sought an Extended Fund Facility from the International Monetary Fund. In July 2019, the IMF approved a 39-month, US$6 billion program for Pakistan that called for fiscal consolidation, revenue mobilisation, energy-sector reform, and tighter macroeconomic management.

Khan's government presented the program as a necessary stabilisation measure after years of mounting debt and external imbalances. The program required reforms to taxation, energy tariffs and subsidy policy, and illustrated the tension in Khan's politics between welfare-state promises and the constraints of external financing.

Khan also argued that Pakistan needed a broader tax base and less dependence on external borrowing, and that elites who avoided taxation should bear a larger share of adjustment.

=== Housing and employment ===
Housing and job creation featured prominently in Khan's campaigns. PTI's 2018 manifesto pledged the construction of five million homes and the creation of ten million jobs over five years, presenting both goals as tools for social mobility and economic stimulus.

The emphasis reflected Khan's broader preference for combining welfare promises with growth through construction, entrepreneurship, and investment rather than through a purely state-directed model.

== Environment and climate change ==
Climate policy was one of Khan's most internationally visible agendas. PTI's 2018 manifesto described climate change as an existential threat to Pakistan and called for reforestation, cleaner energy, water conservation, and stronger environmental governance.

As prime minister, Khan backed the Ten Billion Tree Tsunami afforestation program, which built on the earlier Billion Tree project in Khyber Pakhtunkhwa. His government also announced a Protected Areas Initiative and a "Green Stimulus" program intended to create nature-based jobs while expanding conservation efforts.

Khan also endorsed a long-term energy shift away from coal and toward renewables. In 2020 he said Pakistan would target 60 percent clean energy by 2030 and would approve no new coal-based power generation.

== Foreign and security policy ==
=== In general ===
Khan has generally framed foreign policy in terms of sovereignty, regional peace, economic connectivity, and advocacy for Muslim causes. In his speech after the 2018 election, he said Pakistan should improve relations with all neighbouring states, strengthen ties with China, seek peace in Afghanistan, build a mutually respectful relationship with the United States, and maintain good relations with both Saudi Arabia and Iran.

He has also argued that Pakistan should avoid becoming a client state and should pursue a more independent foreign policy, particularly in relation to the United States and wars in the broader region.

=== Afghanistan and the United States ===
Khan was a long-standing critic of Pakistan's support for the U.S.-led war in Afghanistan and argued for a negotiated settlement with the Taliban. Before and during his premiership, he maintained that Pakistan had paid too high a human and economic price for the conflict.

After the U.S. withdrawal from Afghanistan, Khan rejected the idea of allowing American military or CIA bases on Pakistani soil, responding "Absolutely not" when asked whether Pakistan would host them for counterterrorism operations. This position was consistent with his broader insistence that Pakistan should not again be used as a platform for another foreign war.

=== China ===
Khan has treated relations with China as a cornerstone of Pakistan's foreign and economic policy. He strongly supported the China–Pakistan Economic Corridor (CPEC), while arguing that its "next phase" should focus more on industrialisation, agriculture, social development and poverty alleviation rather than only on large infrastructure projects.

He presented CPEC not only as a strategic partnership but also as a vehicle for employment, industrial growth and regional connectivity.

=== India and Kashmir ===
Khan has alternated between conciliatory and confrontational rhetoric on India. After the 2018 election, he said that if India took "one step" toward better relations, Pakistan would take "two", and he emphasized that trade and dialogue were preferable to conflict.

However, Kashmir remained the central limitation on his India policy. After India revoked the special constitutional status of Jammu and Kashmir in August 2019, Khan adopted a far harder line, condemned the decision internationally, and said there was no point in substantive talks under the new status quo.

=== Saudi Arabia, Iran and the Muslim world ===
Khan has argued that Pakistan should maintain good relations with both Saudi Arabia and Iran and, where possible, serve as a facilitator between them. In 2019 he visited Tehran and Riyadh amid regional tensions and publicly offered Pakistan's services to reduce the risk of conflict.

More broadly, Khan made opposition to Islamophobia a recurring theme of his diplomacy, urging Muslim-majority states and international organisations to coordinate against anti-Muslim hatred and sacrilege.

=== Russia and Ukraine ===
Khan's approach to Russia emphasized pragmatic engagement. His February 2022 visit to Moscow, which went ahead as Russia launched its invasion of Ukraine, drew intense international attention.

After the invasion began, Khan said he regretted that the conflict had not been averted and called for dialogue and diplomacy. Pakistan's official line, reflected in Khan's remarks, emphasized regret and negotiation rather than an outright public denunciation of Russia.

== See also ==
- Imran Khan
- Pakistan Tehreek-e-Insaf
- Premiership of Imran Khan
