= Coop (Switzerland) =

Swiss consumer cooperative

Coop Genossenschaft Coop société coopérative Coop società cooperativa

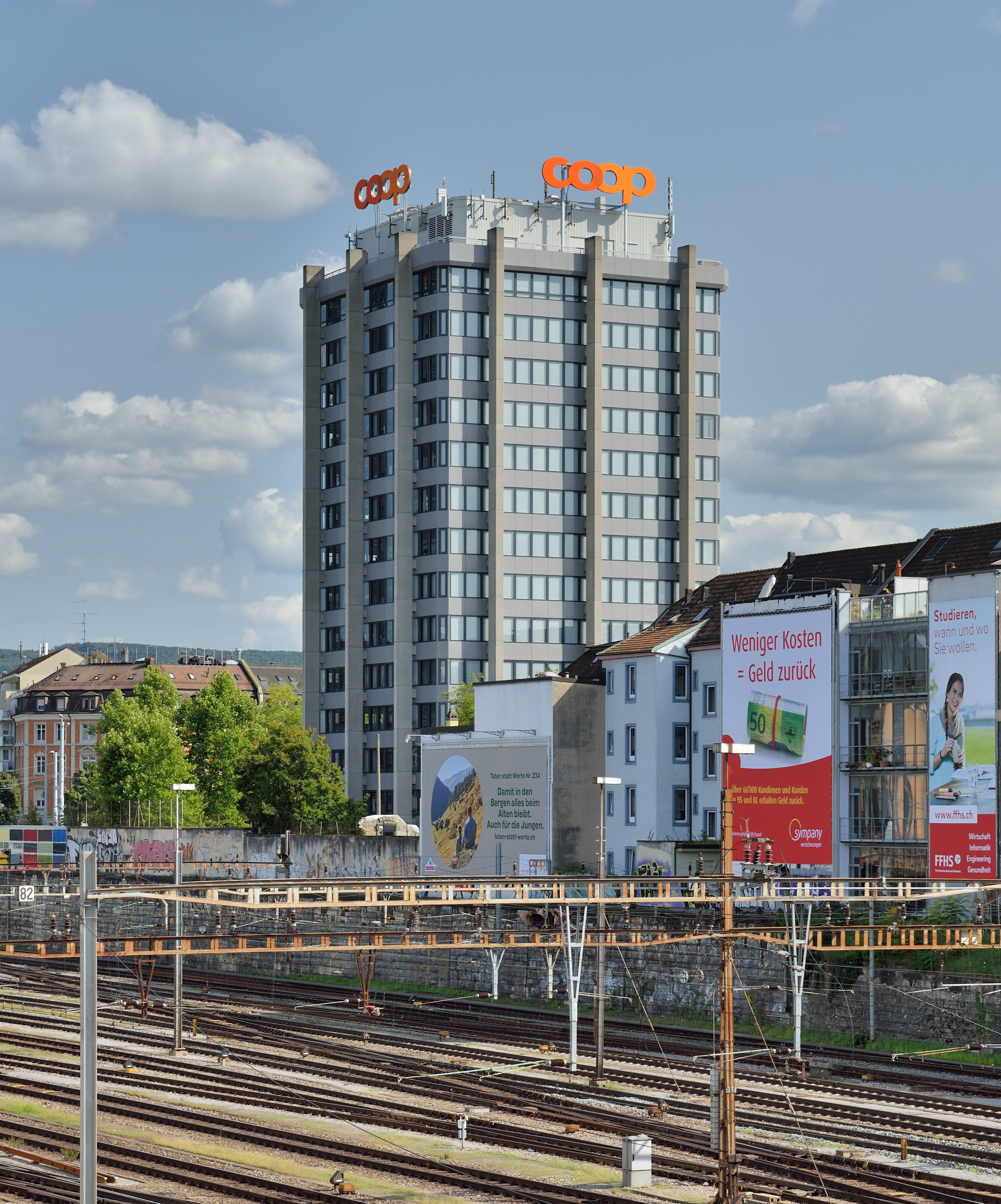
- Headquarters in Basel, Switzerland
- Type: Cooperative
- Industry: Wholesale distribution
- Predecessor: VSK/USC (founded in 1890)
- Founded: 1969; 57 years ago
- Headquarters: Basel, Switzerland
- Key people: Joos Sutter (Chairman of the Executive Committee); Hansueli Loosli (Chairman of the Board of Directors)
- Revenue: 30.7 billion CHF (2019)
- Members: 2,500,000
- Number of employees: 90,307 (2019)
- Website: coop.ch

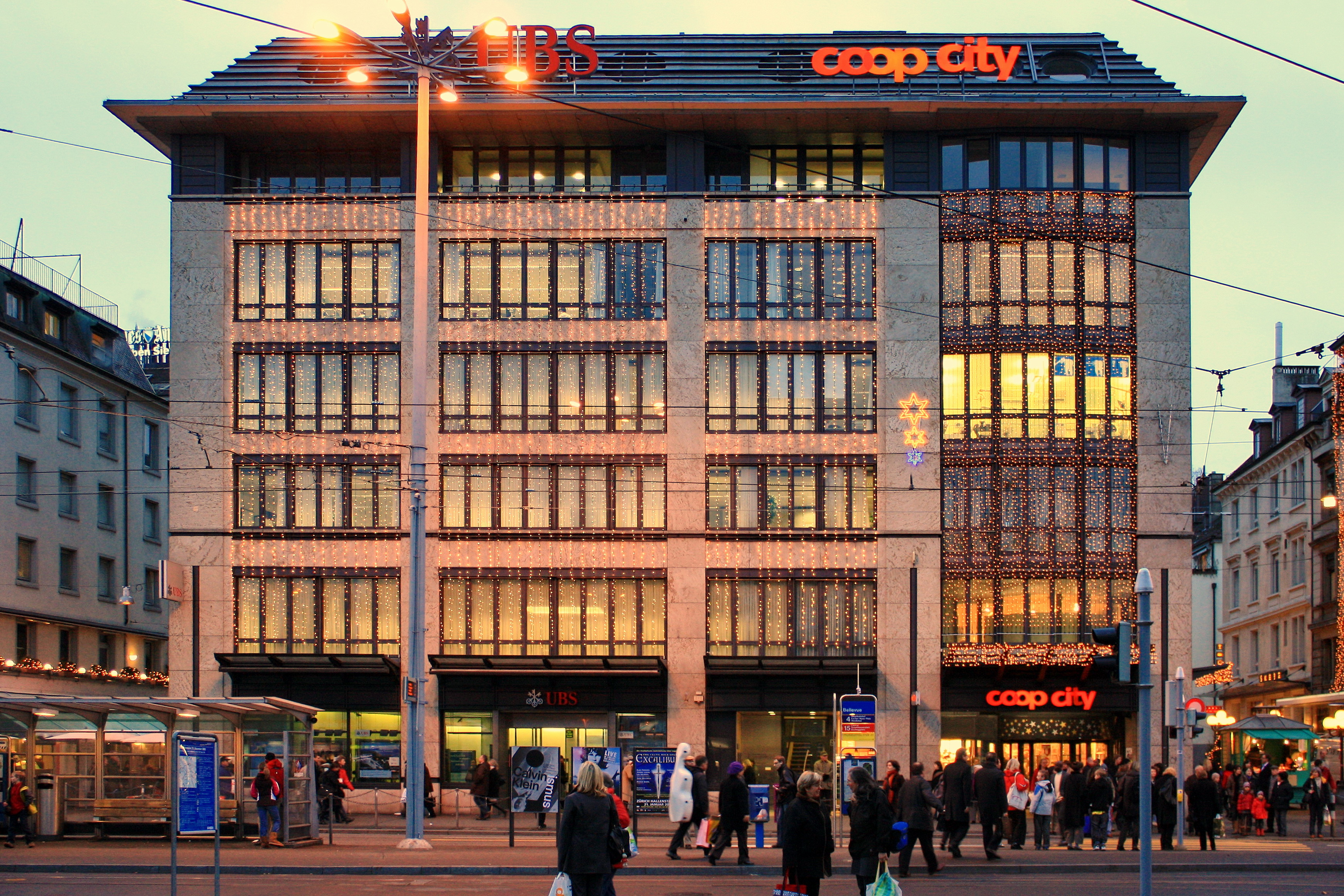
Coop city at Bellevue square in Zürich

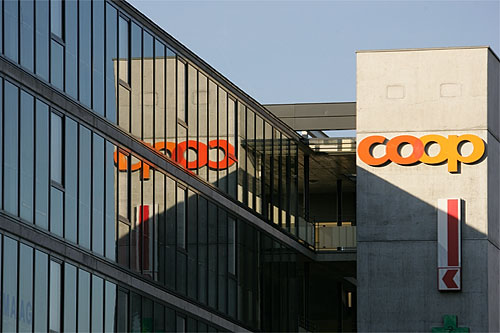
Coop in a shopping center in Oberwil

Coop (German pronunciation: [ˈkoʔop]) is one of Switzerland's largest retail and wholesale companies. It is structured in the form of a cooperative society with around 2.5 million members. The company has no relationship to other similarly-named supermarket chains in Sweden, the United Kingdom, Italy or the Netherlands.

As of 2019, Coop operated 2,478 shops and employed more than 90,000 people in Switzerland.

== Summary ==
The Coop Group is headquartered in Switzerland and operates in the retail, wholesale, and production sectors. Coop Group operates store formats in the food, non-food and service sectors. With Transgourmet Holding AG, Coop is Europe's second largest cash & carry and wholesale supplies business. In total, the Coop Group has around 2,500 retail outlets in Switzerland and 124 cash & carry markets in Switzerland and other European countries.

According to Bio Suisse, the Swiss organic producers' association, Coop accounts for half of all the organic food sold in Switzerland. In June 2011, independent German rating agency Oekom Research awarded Coop with the title of "World's Most Sustainable Retailer". Coop has three primary brands with a sustainability selling proposition: Coop Oecoplan (various daily life products), Coop Naturaline (textile products) and Coop Naturaplan (food). The company also sells products bearing the Max Havelaar Fairtrade label.

Coop also has a low-cost product line, "Prix Garantie". Coop owns the Swiss chocolate company Halba.

Coop publishes a weekly magazine called Coopzeitung (in German), Coopération (in French) and Cooperazione (in Italian).

The chain has an online presence at coop.ch. The web site offers much of the same selection found in the Coop stores and delivers groceries, wine, flowers, books, and other products to customers in Switzerland and Liechtenstein. It currently markets its services in German, French, Italian, and English

== History ==
=== Verband Schweizerischer Konsumvereine ===
In the second half of the 19th century, consumer cooperatives were founded in many Swiss cities. In 1864, textile industrialist Jean Jenny-Ryffel formed Switzerland's first consumer cooperative in Schwanden in the canton of Glarus. Over the next years, many other cooperative societies emerged in the country. In 1853 and 1869, two attempts to merge the consumer cooperatives of Zurich, Basel, Bern, Grenchen, Biel, and Olten ended in failure. This was finally achieved during a third meeting held on 11 January 1890, in Olten, when the Verband Schweizerischer Konsumvereine (VSK) (French: Union suisse des sociétés de consommation (USC)) was founded. Five cooperatives served as founding members; by the end of that year, the VSK counted 43 members. As the number of cooperatives grew—reaching 407 by 1915—the VSK expanded both its operations and its infrastructure. In 1902, the Genossenschaftliches Volksblatt was published for the first time, serving as the precursor to today's Coopzeitung.

The organization's most significant expansion took place during the first quarter of the 20th century, though this growth was slowed by trade policy barriers following the First World War. During the Second World War, the VSK dedicated its entire resources to supporting the national supply effort. After the war ended, both Switzerland's gross domestic product and its resident population rose steadily; consequently, retail supply increased in tandem with growing demand. The VSK's first self-service store was opened in 1948 at Stauffacherstrasse 20 by the Lebensmittelverein Zürich (LVZ). The Coop logo was introduced in 1960.

=== Coop Switzerland ===
The most pivotal turning point in the Association's history occurred in 1969 with the introduction of a new corporate strategy, symbolically marked by the change of the organization's name from VSK to Coop Switzerland. A key component of this new strategy was a merger plan that reduced the number of cooperatives, which at the time was 407, to approximately 30 to 40 regional cooperatives. Subsequent merger plans transformed these entities into regional cooperatives, the number of which still stood at 14 in the mid-1990s. Driven by the construction of large supermarkets, the number of retail outlets declined even as total retail floor space increased. Furthermore, the non-food sector expanded significantly following the opening of department stores and DIY centers during the 1970s and 1980s.

In 1970, Coop Rechtsschutz was founded as a subsidiary of the Coop Group.

In 1974, the rebate system based on discount stamps was discontinued and net pricing was introduced. On 14 September 1977, the Coop Mittwochstudio aired for the first time on the SRF 1 television channel. This infotainment-style infomercial program was cancelled in 2005. It was hosted by various presenters, including Bella Neri from 1977 to 1988. Starting in 1982, recipes were also featured on the show. In 1993, Armin Amrein was hired as the resident studio chef. In 2004, the program which was renamed Coop Studio by that time, was hosted by Tanja Gutmann. In 2005, René Rindlisbacher joined the hosting team shortly before the show was cancelled. Additionally, the program Telescoop aired daily between 2002 and 2005.

In November 1988, Coop launched "Tell" beer, which was initially produced at the Calanda Bräu brewery in Chur and the Brasserie du Boxer brewery in Romanel-sur-Lausanne.

Coop holds a 19.7% stake in Centravo Holding AG, a company founded in 1990 for the processing of slaughterhouse by-products.

In 1991, a majority stake was acquired in the Konsumverein Zürich, followed by its complete takeover in 1995.

=== Coop Group Genossenschaft ===
As part of the CoopForte project, all 14 regional cooperatives and Coop Switzerland merged on 1 January 2001, to form the Coop-Group Genossenschaft (French: Coop société coopérative; Italian: Coop società cooperativa). On this same date, the transition to the new logo featuring the four orange letters was also completed. From November 2001 onwards, the Betty Bossi brand was jointly owned, with equal 50% stakes held by Coop and the media company Ringier. Effective 21 December 2012, Coop acquired Ringier's remaining 50% stake in Betty Bossi AG (In 2021, Betty Bossi AG was transformed into a division of the Coop Genossenschaft, and the AG was dissolved).

In 2001, Switzerland's first Coop Megastore opened in Crissier.

In 2002, Coop acquired the department store chain EPA, continuing to operate its commercially successful locations as Coop-City department stores. Additionally, in 2003, Waro AG was integrated into the Coop-Group. The former Waro branches were converted into Coop retail outlets of various store formats.

In 2005, a partnership with Weight Watchers was initiated, and a product line of the same name was introduced. That same year saw the launch of the low-price product line "Prix Garantie", as well as the start of the first self-scanning pilot project in the Swiss retail sector at the Coop supermarket in Frenkendorf.

In 2006, together with five other Swiss companies (Charles Vögele, Denner, Manor, Migros, and Valora), Coop founded the Interessengemeinschaft Detailhandel Schweiz (IG DHS).

In August 2007, Coop acquired the twelve large-format supermarkets of Carrefour Switzerland for 470 million francs and converted them into Coop Megastores in 2008. In November 2007, following approval by the Competition Commission, Coop acquired Dipl. Ing. Fust AG, a retailer of household appliances and consumer electronics, from Jelmoli Holding; this acquisition included Service 7000 and netto24 AG. Coop subsequently integrated the company into the Coop-Group as a subsidiary operating independently in the market.

The entity that would later become Bank Coop was founded on 30 October 1927, by the Verband Schweizerischer Konsumvereine and the Swiss Federation of Trade Unions under the name the Genossenschaftliche Zentralbank (French: Banque Centrale Coopérative; Italian: Banca Centrale Cooperativa). In 1970, the Assembly of Delegates voted to convert the institution into a public limited company. In 1995 it was renamed Bank Coop (Banque Coop; Banca Coop). On 20 December 20, 1999, Basler Kantonalbank became the majority shareholder; the name change to "Bank Coop" was officially implemented in 2001. On 19 May 2017, the institution undertook a comprehensive rebranding and became the Bank Cler (Banque Cler; Banca Cler).

Since 2010, Coop has operated the transport company Railcare, utilizing seven Siemens Vectron Rem476 locomotives as well as a fleet of trucks. In addition to supplying Coop’s own retail outlets, the services provided by "railCare" are also available to external clients. On 7 November 2025, a logistics hub was inaugurated in the Hardfeld district of Zurich, enabling the delivery of goods to over 70 retail locations within the city of Zurich via rail.

In 2011, Pearlwater Mineralquellen AG with headquarters in Termen in the canton of Valais, was acquired.

In March 2014, Coop acquired nettoShop AG, a nationwide leader in online retail of household electrical appliances. That same year, Coop acquired Marché Restaurants Schweiz AG from Mövenpick. In addition to the Marché restaurants located at highway rest stops, the company now also operates Zopf & Zöpfli, Cindy’s Diner, and Popeyes, among others. Furthermore, Marché is a licensee for several Burger King locations. In early April 2016, Coop entered the fitness studio sector with the acquisition of Update Fitness, a chain of studios based in Eastern Switzerland. The 74th Update Fitness branch was opened in 2023. At the end of 2016, Coop purchased the 30 Aperto Shops locations situated near railway stations; these became part of the Coop-Group effective January 2017. The remaining 19 locations, which operate as gas station convenience stores, were sold to the fuel station operator Oel-Pool. The stores are to continue operating under their existing name, and all employees were retained. The purchase price for the 30 locations was reportedly around CHF 100 million. In 2018, Coop acquired a minority stake in Two Spice AG, a company active in the gastronomy sector which includes brands such as Yooji’s and Rice Up! It became the company’s majority shareholder in 2023. In June 2017, Tropenhaus Frutigen AG was integrated into the Coop Cooperative. Tropenhaus Wolhusen was divested in December 2019 for a symbolic price of one franc. The Tropenhaus has been closed since the spring of 2025. Under the new company name Bergquellfisch Frutigen, those in charge are now focusing entirely on the sustainable production of Swiss caviar and perch.

At the delegates' assembly on 28 March 2019, Doris Leuthard was elected to the Board of Directors of Coop.

Built in 1978, the Coop high-rise building in Basel-Gundeldingen underwent extensive renovation beginning in 2019. As of June 2019, 1,275 employees worked at the Coop headquarters located within the high-rise. The renovation work was completed in 2021. The building-integrated photovoltaics cover approximately ten percent of the building's electricity needs.

In 2019, the Coop City St. Annahof store in Zurich reopened following renovation work.

Due to the coronavirus pandemic, the Federal Council ordered the closure of all non-food retail formats and restaurants on 17 March 2020, and restricted the product ranges available in supermarkets. Over 1,000 retail outlets were forced to close. Effective 19 October 2020, a mandatory mask requirement was implemented in all retail outlets.

In 2021, Coop acquired the DIY chain Jumbo and merged it with its own brand, "Coop Bau + Hobby". Following the closure of the Coop City store at Marktgasse 24 in Bern, a Coop grocery store was opened at that location in 2021 when renovation work was completed.

In October 2023, it was announced that Coop intends to enter the so-called neobanking sector, partly through a partnership with Hypothekarbank Lenzburg.

Effective 1 September 2026, Coop will take over four Ospelt supermarkets located in Balzers, Eschen, Ruggell, and Grabs, which had most recently been operated as Migros partner stores.

=== Experiments with the Coop Railshop ===
In May 2000, in collaboration with the Schweizerischen Bundesbahnen (SBB), Coop introduced an innovative concept: the Coop Railshop, two mobile stores housed in specially converted dining cars that had previously been operated by McDonald's. On the route between Zurich and Bern, the Railshop offered a selection of around 900 daily necessities, including fresh food, beverages, sandwiches, tobacco products, and magazines. The railcar operated from Monday to Friday, making ten daily runs and serving intermediate stops in cities such as Baden, Aarau, and Olten.

The concept proved unsuccessful and was discontinued in 2002. The dining car used for the project (SBB S 50 85 89-75 750-1) was later repurposed for use in firefighter training exercises.

== Passabene (self-checkout) ==
Coop was one of the first self-checkout providers in Switzerland, introducing its own system called Passabene in 2005. It is in use in 80 stores. Coop uses the MC17T Retail Mobile Computer by Motorola Solutions for this application. They later introduced mobile apps that customers can use to scan items.

== Cargo Sous Terrain ==
Cargo Sous Terrain (CST) is a planned underground logistics system – its first phase in the Mittelland region is scheduled by the early 2030s. As of January 2016, the company's respective association (Förderverein Cargo sous terrain) was based at the seat of Coop (Genossenschaft Basel) in Basel.

== Swissmill ==
Swissmill operates the largest granary in Switzerland that produces 800 tonnes of grain daily, representing 30% of the national grain requirements. Its flour is prepared for all bread products produced by the Swiss retailers Coop, Volg, and Landi. Although the Swissmill Tower's exterior and height in Zürich is disputed, the municipal authorities claim that the silo is intentionally designed in its aesthetically conscious way. Its external appearance is intended to express its interior – an industrial plant.

== Criticism ==
Unlike competitor Migros, Coop stores sell cigarettes and other tobacco products. Since 2003, Coop even markets its own brands of cigarettes ('5.65' and 'Bay'), the cheapest in Switzerland, which makes them especially attractive to youth. In 2025, Coop was found to advertise discounted cigarettes, although 'price comparisons' are forbidden by the tobacco legislation in Switzerland since 2024.

== See also ==
- List of supermarket chains in Switzerland
