= Love (Lennon & Maisy song) =

Single by Lennon & Maisy
- Released: January 31, 2014
- Genre: Folk
- Length: 3:19
- Label: HitMill Records
- Songwriter(s): Lennon Stella, Maisy Stella

Lennon & Maisy singles chronology
"A Life That's Good" (2013)	"Love" (2014)	"That's What's Up" (2014)

"Love" is a song by Canadian music duo Lennon & Maisy. They recorded the song for a Coop Naturaplan TV commercial. The song reached number two in Switzerland for three consecutive weeks.

== Charts ==
=== Weekly charts ===
Chart (2014)	Peak position
Switzerland (Schweizer Hitparade)	2

=== Year-end charts ===
Chart (2014)	Position
Switzerland (Schweizer Hitparade)	46
