= Easy Treesie =

The Easy Treesie project was set up as a Climate Action initiative. It aims to plant a million trees with school children and their communities in Ireland. The Project has hosted 4 Plant-for-the-Planet Tree Academies at Baldoyle, 2017, Malahide, 2019, the Royal Irish Academy, 2020 and the first online Tree Academy in 2020. In collaboration with the Tree Council of Ireland over 500,000 tree saplings have been distributed by this initiative since its first joint large planting drive with Science Foundation Ireland during National Science Week in November 2019, when 30,000 saplings were planted in one week.
