= Global Marshall Plan Initiative =

Organization for world balance

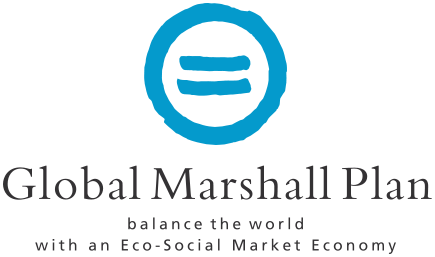
Global Marshall Plan Initiative Logo

The Global Marshall Plan Initiative self-report as an integrative organizational platform for a "world in balance". Composed of a network of more than 5000 supporters from all levels of society, brought together from politics, economics and civil society, the Initiative is based on five core goals for fair globalization. Through its network-like character, it is organized through even hierarchies and without a center. Everyone is invited to actively participate and take action with their circles and the accompanying opportunities to implement a world in balance.

The goal of the Global Marshall Plan Initiative is to establish a framework compatible with sustainability for the global economy – a global Eco-Social Market Economy.

== Origins ==
Al Gore - Author of "Earth in the Balance: Ecology and the Human Spirit"

The idea of a Global Marshall Plan was first published in 1990 by U.S. politician, entrepreneur and environmentalist Al Gore in his book “Earth in the Balance: Ecology and the Human Spirit”. The choice of name deliberately recalls the historical Marshall Plan after the Second World War (officially: European Recovery Program), a symbol for hope, solidarity and peace.

The idea of a Global Marshall Plan was not new but had already been endorsed in the 1990s by personalities from a variety of sectors: Kofi Annan, Al Gore, Hans Küng, Susan George, Mikhail Gorbachev, His Royal Highness Prince El Hassan bin Talal of Jordan, George Soros, Lutz Wicke, Georg Winter and many others (Global Contract). As early as the beginning of the 1990s an ecological Marshall Plan was established by prominent personalities such as journalist Franz Alt and German Green politician Joschka Fisher. Along with many others, they called for the establishment of an eco-social market economy, 100 billion DM put towards the environment every year and a kerosene tax.

As the world increasingly finds itself in a difficult, unsustainable situation as a result of rapid globalization, both in terms of environmental issues, poverty and unequal distribution, as well as the disproportionate cultural balance, on May 16, 2003 representatives from 16 civil society organizations revived the original idea for a global Marshall Plan as a movement for world peace, sustainability and justice, and at the Frankfurt Airport, the Global Marshall Plan initiative was launched. Since the initiative should be organized as a network - i.e., locally and without hierarchies - the coordination of tasks and activities was assigned to different people and institutions: the coordination of content was taken up by Prof. Dr. Franz-Josef Radermacher as Head of FAW/n, politicians, and Josef Riegler, with particular importance on an EU level and the Eco-Social Forum Europe. The coordination, initiation and promotion of supporters’ activities internationally were assigned the Global Contract Foundation and Frithjof Finkbeiner. Due to the enormous positive response and the wide range of activities, this commission was soon transferred to the Global Marshall Plan Foundation.

The long-term goal of the initiative is to establish a global eco-social market economy and alter the current failing global framework to lead to long-lasting peace and sustainability. From the beginning, the founders set themselves the goal of developing the initiative as openly as possible and also of winning over the support of the economy. All actors and parts of the global society should find that in the Global Marshall Plan one-sided organization can constructively be prevented. The initiative aims to provide the greatest possible support to the world to ensure that the plan is continually developed in its substance, quality, implementation and coverage.

In a series of lectures in 2003–4, the initiative was refined further. Eventually the first report on the Global Marshall Plan Initiative (“Global Marshall Plan – A Planetary Contract for a global Eco-Social Market Economy) was compiled. It was published in September 2004.

Gradually, an increasing number of members from both the European Parliament and national parliaments started to support the initiative. This was soon followed by endorsements from civil society organizations, economic entities, and the first university. The initiative has garnered international acclaim, evolving into a network comprising over 5,000 individual supporters, organizations, various federal states, and communities.

Believing that change will come from the center of society, supporters raise awareness of the issues surrounding globalization and motivate those around them for the implementation of fair globalization. Lectures are an essential part of spreading the word. By raising awareness and informing, alliances are formed, and pressure is created from “bottom-up”. Those motivated are trained through multiplier training in Global Marshall Plan Academies.

== Self-understanding ==
Despite major advances in material prosperity and quality of life for a significant portion of the world, poverty, deprivation, and the resulting illnesses are still widespread. The increasing overexploitation of nature, overexploitation of limited resources, and the expected catastrophic consequences linked to climate change will present humanity with a globally significant challenge in the near future.

The high and ongoing resource needs of developing countries, poverty and population growth are among the key problems. Many hundreds of millions of people do not benefit from the positive effects of ongoing globalization. This has further increased the historical power imbalance and income gap between rich industrial nations and the poorest developing countries. The spread of AIDS and looming population growth also accelerate this gap.

Any effort to overcome this unsustainable development will be four times more difficult in the future, or even impossible, if a fundamental turnaround is not set in place soon.

The Global Marshall Plan Initiative is a network that brings together representatives from politics, economics, science, and civil society to promote equitable globalization. The organization combines "bottom-up" grassroots awareness campaigns with "top-down" political lobbying to advance its policy goals.

Through lectures, information events and publications, more people and groups are continually informed about the absolute necessity and the possibility of a global Eco-Social framework, so that political change comes from the center of society. At the same time, support for the Global Marshall Plan and a global Eco-Social Market Economy is acquired from national, European and international decision makers through a direct approach.

== Goals ==
The goal of the Global Marshall Plan Initiative is to make a substantial contribution to a global eco-social market economy. This eco-social Marshall Plan would include realistic perspectives:

- to overcome the degrading poverty of half of mankind, which long has been identified as chief cause of the existing world problems
- to successfully establish global ecological and social standards for a sustainable development
- to overcome the deep cultural frustration and humiliation experienced by the majority of the world's civilization and at the same time to eliminate the explosive environment that generates international terrorism and endangers global security
- for a new economic miracle which specifically boosts the human potential of more than three billion people (which until now has been laying absolutely idle). This would ultimately bring use to the whole human race
- to create fair globalization
- and to accomplish human rights and human dignity for everyone.

According to the initiative, a Global Marshall Plan could also allow attractive new perspectives for many other problems caused by an unbalanced globalization. Possible impacts for example could be:

- The wealth and therefore the wages would increase in developing countries, so that the wage pressure in the economies of traditional industrialized countries will drop. The increased demand on the world's market would also then contribute to a heightened job security in industrialized countries.
- An implementation of ecological goals would be far more realistic than is currently the case, since because poverty is, as the argument goes, one of the reasons for environmental damages in the poorest countries. Those who would fight for daily survival, will be hardly convinced of environmental protection. In most parts of the world the implementation of ecological goals can only be realistic when they are directly linked to active promotion of social and ecological development.
- The model of an open, peaceful, democratic, constitutional and educated civil society, which many see as best guarantee for a good and dynamic future perspective, would be brought forward by the eco-social Marshall Plan.

The goal of the Global Marshall Plan Initiative is to globally link appropriate order processes with competitive mechanisms to create value added systems by combining potential, resources and infrastructure with well planned, institutional solutions. A global eco-social market economy would therefore create the right balance between competitive economy, social solidarity and ecological sustainability.

== The logic of the plan ==
Central to the logic of a plan is the following basic principle, as introduced by the Global Marshall Plan Initiative:

Investments, coordinated market openings and co-financing provide the harmonization that results in social and ecological standards. A form of targeted global overcoming of poverty should therefore emerge that will release especially strong new economic stimuli for the regions concerned, as well as for the whole global economy. By combining new growth with clear ecological standards at the same time a strong environmental approach to economic activities should be encouraged.

According to initiative, the new economic, ecological and social perspectives would have a strong impulse for a peaceful global community, which in turn is important for a lasting and sustained growth of economy.

It is also assumed that the positive effects of a Global Marshall Plan would also consequently increase the pull-on governments, who so far have been averse to the eco-social movement. It would reinforce the pressure on these governments to give space for these developments, to reduce corruption and boost Good Governance. Good Governance signifies a well- working guidance and control system of a political social unit as a state or a community. The principles often include terms such as transparency, efficiency, participation, responsibility, constitutional state, democracy and justice often belong to the principles.

Especially important is that the Global Marshall Plan overcomes old clashes of interests and that it achieves broad support.

One of the intermediate results of the present process is that it is supported by commercial and industrial enterprises and their federations as well as critics of the previous form of globalization and representatives from the “North” and “South”. Several well known representatives of all main political movements, all civil sectors and global acting networks of civil society argued vehemently for the initiative. The existing approaches and ideas of the initiative could open is a real prospect to bridge the wide social gap.

== Key requirements for a world in balance ==
Elements of the Global Marshall Plan, including the five interrelated building blocks of the plan, have already been mentioned in previous UN summits, European policy and demands from various NGOs and institutions. The five building blocks, which are continually adapted to the current challenges, form the starting point and at the same time the foundation of the initiative.

=== Further development and implementation of the UN Millennium Development Goals ===
In September 2000 the United Nations (UN) came together at the General Assembly to discuss the most important challenges in the coming decade. In the final Millennium Declaration, globalization was highlighted as one of the most important current issues.

In this declaration, the 192 UN member states committed themselves to the concrete Millennium Development Goals, which should help to ensure everyone benefits from globalization.

The UN Millennium Development Goals represent the beliefs of the initiative – the first intermediate step towards fair world order and to sustainable development. It is unlikely that the goals will be achieved by 2015. Many problems have even worsened, highlighting a glaring failure of the international community. If anything, this should be all the more incentive to updates the goals and meet them promptly.

=== Achieving the 0.7% target and raising an additional necessary funds ===
A series of appropriate and necessary declarations and agreements (such as the above-mentioned Millennium Development Goals) have been only previously implemented to an extremely discouraging extent. If the apparent gap between declaration of intent and ability to act is not soon overcome, we are threatened with an escalation of global problems. Especially worrying is the looming crisis of confidence in decision-making processes on all levels and inability to enact policies in general.

The phase of understanding must therefore immediately be followed by a phase of decisive implementation. This involves not only the delivery mechanism (see 5.4) but also all questions of financing.

The financial means needed to achieve the Millennium Development Goals lies, after an analysis from the UNO, at around US$50 billion per year plus some $20 billion for the provision of public goods and humanitarian missions. Considering the current situation significantly more resources are needed for development aid and the implementation of the MDGs. By enforcing the 0.7% GNP target, which the United Nations has been aiming at for decades, the means to finance development aid would be available.

In comparison:

The percentage volume of the US Marshall Plan after the Second World War was 1.3% of gross domestic product (GDP) of the USA – over a time period of 4 years.

Global military spending in 2004 amounted to around $1000 billion excluding the cost for the Iraq War. The Iraq War has already cost an additional several hundred billion US dollars.

These numbers illustrate that the proposed Global Marshall Plan on the stated level is by all means able to be financed.

=== Fair taxation on the global value-added processes ===
As well as market openings and new delivery mechanisms, global development also requires the above-mentioned financial means for international cooperation. Despite the principal way of using national budgets to provide the necessary funds, it would be easier, from a fundamental and procedural point of view, to find another way to allocate these funds.

On the one hand, national budgets are not directly charged, but on the other hand, the generated funds could be better separated from the national interests of donating countries, and it is easier to move forward together when everyone moves at the same pace. Since in the past self-contained national interests have repeatedly affected the efficiency of measures for development cooperation and consequently the public reputation of such programs has significantly decreased. An improvement in finding new means of financing could prove critical both politically as well as for the public acceptance of a Global Marshall Plan.

Therefore, the initiative urges that for regulatory reasons, due to improved governance action, for increased transparency, and in particular for better controls on the world finance sectors, tax on global value-added processes and the use of Global Commons must be systematically established. Examples of these include a global financial transactions tax, the trade with CO_{2} emissions allowances in context of climate justice and a kerosene tax. The following are some examples:

==== Financial transactions tax ====
Another proposal to finance a Global Marshall Plan, which also has support from numerous experts, is a tax on global financial transactions. The financial transaction tax (FTT) is currently on the verge of a breakthrough in the EU.

Critics of this idea are concerned that as a result of the tax, the “collective intelligence” in control of highly sensitive financial flows would be charged. On the contrary, in the recent excesses and “bubbles” of international capital, financial markets and the New Economy, this intelligence has proved to be not all that far reaching. However, it is in any case only a cautious use of these instruments and this suggested only on a global level.

A cautious start could be, for example, a global financial transaction tax of initially 0.01% If this proves to be positive, the value could be increased to 0.02%. With this, $30–40 billion could be raised each year.

However it must be acknowledged that such a global tax would require the establishment of new international structures that would possess the necessary authority as well as the effective sanctions.

==== Other considerations ====
In addition to the two presented financing options, the establishment of a Global Climate Certificate System (GCCS), a Future Bond, an International Finance Facility and a Kerosene Tax are also being discussed.

Other important considerations include the debt of development countries, closing offshore tax havens, which deprive national tax systems of some $50 billion every year, dismantling protectionist structures as well as discussions on an international cartel authority.

=== Fair, global partnerships and effective appropriation of funds ===
A fair partnership in development assistance on all levels and an adequate cash flow are the requirements for a sustainable future perspective for the entire world. Promoting Good Governance, subsidiaries, rationality, education, combating corruption, as well as an appropriation of funds, coordinated and directed at a grass-roots level, are considered crucial for self-regulated development (e.g. micro-financing).

To be able to develop the desired effect and gain broad and sustained support of global civil society but also to find the economy and politics, earlier mistakes in development cooperation must be avoided in the implementation of the Global Marshall Plan.

The overcoming of global market fundamentalism and the realization of a global eco-social market economy should be made possible by establishing a better framework for the global economy in a fair global agreement. The most appropriate way appears to primarily be the relationship between ethic, economic, ecological, social, cultural and democratic standards with such a program.

The standards and codes of practice are related to (co)financing programs. The allocation of funds must not be influenced through short-term economic interests of rich countries or through short-term power interests of elites in poor countries. This can best be achieved through a consistent focus on the mentioned standards, an associated accountability, an active and transparent involvement of industry and the organization of civil society.

The first phase of the Global Marshall Plan seeks for the application of the following standards which have already been agreed on by UN member states:

Basic economic, social and cultural human rights, which are largely congruent with the core standards of the International Labour Organization (ILO), such as organizational rights, gender equality, prohibition of child labour etc.

Standards of international environmental and conservation agreements such as the Convention on Bio-diversity, CITES (the Convention on International Trade in Endangered Species of Wild Fauna and Flora, or the Washington Convention) and the Kyoto Protocol.

Ignoring some of these standards represents, in many areas, the most important competitive economic advantages for less developed countries. The example of EU enlargement shows however that agreements on the application of common high standards and protection levels can be achieved, if accompanied by a co-financing of the development of weaker partners by developed countries is ensured. This coupling is profitable for all involved.

Previously the most effective ways of enforcing standards on a global level were held by the World Trade Organization (WTO). However the organization has received criticism like hardly any other. This is mainly because, in accordance with their mandate, they primarily promote the reduction of trade barriers and in doing so, discounts ecological, social and cultural aspects.

In the long-term, however, the WTO could still be reformed into a sustainable institution with trade regulations associated with the above-mentioned standards towards a fair, balanced and sustainability-oriented economic system. This should provide all elements of the prospective framework for non-compliance with the same legal action and sanction options. The equality of trade, environmental and social standards through a link with the WTO is one of the central concerns of the initiative.

Alternative considerations concerning the enforceability of ecological and social standards focus on strengthening a reformed UN and more efficient means of enforcing social standards within the ILO or human rights.

Every level, from the individual and local, to the national and global, has its own, essential function in a globalized world. One accomplishment of the tasks according to the principle of subsidiarity (principle that states matters ought to be handled by the smallest, lowest or least centralized competent authority) is essential for an efficient implementation of a Global Marshall Plan and requires a lot of changes, since the political decision-making structures of today are still far from fulfilling the needs of the growing world society.

Knowledge transfers, empowerment, investments directed at education and health must be central to the effort. Important aspects to achieve a reasonable regulatory framework and a self-regulated development include:

- Fair cooperation based on partnerships on all levels
- Strengthening of decision-making and organization opportunities for partner countries
- Promoting Good Governance and fighting corruption
- Appropriation of funds, coordinated and directed at a grass-roots level, e.g. micro-credit
- and adequate funding

The ideology that the luck is on the side of the fittest, thus essentially stating that poverty is caused by itself, dismisses the many dimensions of poverty and neglects its causes which lie not finally in the unequal property and power structures that have maintained poverty and dependence for centuries.

A worldwide expansion of “Western” development and suppressing our unsustainable, undesirable development does not lead to worldwide wealth in any way, but to cultural impoverishment as well as the destruction of our natural resources.

==== From development aid to development cooperation ====
The arrogance of the Western civilization, which is perceived by people as humiliating, degrading and threatening, provokes anti-Western sentiment and provides the breeding ground for hate and violence. There are also unfairly distributed opportunities and a lack of balance of interests.

Combating the misery in the world is not just a handout, but humanitarian duty and peace policy is also in our best interests. These days widespread human security can not be achieved when we’re against one another, only when we’re with one another. In addition it is necessary to build mutual trust, to accept those in disadvantaged countries as equal partners and to allow contributions from international negotiation and decision-making processes.

==== Application of funds ====
Given the above considerations, the Global Marshall Plan Initiative sees the following principles and suggestions for the application of funds as particularly noteworthy:

- The specific development programs should be coordinated by the appropriated specialized organizations and programs of the United Nations. The role of the United Nations must be strengthened.
- The example of the already established financing organization “The Global Fund to Fight AIDS, Tuberculosis and Malaria” should be observed to see whether establishing such financing organization in the UN's own interaction with the economy and civil society is helpful to the key objectives of the Global Marshall Plan.
- Provided that funds are acquired from world trade tax, it would be worth considering investing this initially into development goals in every economic sector so that income accumulated in these sectors would increase agreement from the economy.
- An essential tool in the application of funds should be the public tender of proposed programs from NGOs to maintain the best cost-income ratio in healthier competition.
- Projects should have clear priority, which are based on entrepreneurial potential of local people – for example small credit banks and development schools where locals are trained by aid workers.
- In technology transfers, the choice of promoted projects should be orientated above all towards those that teach largest possible number of locals the skills, so they are able to cope on their own as quickly and efficiently as possible.

The search for particularly successful, socially efficient and ecological projects and those success criteria should be defined and promoted as new international research priority. In this way the efficiency of many current forms of development assistance could be substantially increased.

=== Framework compatible with sustainability for the global economy: a global Eco-Social Market Economy ===
With the gradual implementation of a global Eco-Social Market Economy, a framework compatible with sustainability for the global economy will be established and the global market fundamentalism will be overcome. Functioning Global Governance structures need to reform existing institutions and policies (e.g. United Nations, World Trade Organization and World Finance Sector), as well as their coherent linkup to create a functioning whole.

== Next stages ==
Currently the initiative for a Global Marshall Plan is supported by more than 5000 individuals, 200 organizations, all Austrian federal states as well as some German states and prominent public figures. In many European and non-European countries the first national and regional structures have been established. From the 19–20 April 2008 representatives from numerous local and regional groups from Germany met in Erfurt to discuss establishing a national initiative with the purpose of a new governance structure of the Global Marshall Plan Initiative. As a result, an Erfurt Declaration was accepted, which expresses the will to establish an umbrella organization to house the local, regional and national groups. As to not contract initiative's own understanding of its network-like character and open design, the establishment of a national organization has recently been abandoned. People can belong to numerous organizations, get involved in local groups informally or organize a club. There should not be a national organization or governing body.

As an international initiative, the goals are strategic: implementing a Global Marshall Plan and developing a broad public awareness of globally responsible action. Only an increased awareness and an improved understanding can be a reliable basis to lead the initiative to become better known and to create fairer globalization.

The Global Marshall Plan Initiative addresses this with their ideas and suggestions aimed at different audiences:

- To all people in the world to contribute to the initiative with their knowledge, experiences and ideas
- To religious organizations as well as the media and artists to spread the ideas of the Global Marshall plan and create awareness
- To interested groups as well as in NGO organized civil societies. The goal is to join forces and fight for a fair, sustainable globalization together.
- To science. All disciplines are invited to help to develop the Global Marshall Plan with detailed and interdisciplinary established projects.
- To the economy to make the Global Marshall Plan one its own concerns to create a socially fair and ecologically responsible economic development
- To governments and parliaments of nation states to officially support the Global Marshall Plan and to develop it through discussion with other actors. This new quality of global action and problem-solving ability lies in the long-term interests of all countries.
- To the European Union as an important bearer of hope for the project and for many people in the entire world. The EU member states are faced with the historical opportunity to make the transition from former colonial powers to partners of efficient and comprehensively understood development policies. The EU can and should courageously develop an alternative to current forms of globalization and consistently advocate them in international negotiations.
- To the UN and its programs and specialized organizations that play a central role in the implementation of these projects. Initiatives to reform the UN in the direction of greater efficiency, competency and funding are supported by the initiative.
- To the G8 to place combating poverty not as short-term measures such as aid and debt relief in the foreground, but to fight structural poverty through a reform of global regulations and institution at their roots.

Shortly after establishing the Global Marshall Plan Initiative, Karolin and Frithjof Finkbeiner founded the Global Marshall Plan Foundation. From them on, the foundation took over from the duties originally assigned to the Global Contract Foundation of an international coordination office of the initiative. Since the foundation has acted as secretariat for the initiative, taking care of the proper application of logos, networking actors and promoting many innovative projects with the help of numerous supporters. Alongside the support of the children's initiative Plant-for-the-Planet, which is active in more than 193 countries, it is possible to organize more international conferences, as for example the Commons Forum, and train around 40 participants through the multiplier training of the Global Marshall Plan Academy that take places yearly.

Some of the more than 200 organizations that support the Global Marshall Plan Initiative, set up a coordination circle for the initiative in December 2010 in Munich and took over the political and content related duties that had until then been shared out between others. The coordination circle develops strategic and content positions of the Global Marshall Plan Initiative, decides which projects to support, works on further development of content and is responsible for the yearly initiative meeting. Since November 2011 members have busied themselves with the development of a list of demands for the financial crisis. The current paper can be downloaded from the initiative's website.

The current projects of the initiative are the University Days: Eco-Social Market Economy and Sustainability, a collaborative project between the initiative and 5 other organizations, as well as other multiplier training through the internationalization and offer of other formats within the Global Marshall Plan Academy. Both projects are supported by the Global Marshall Plan Foundation. The foundation of one of three project offices finances the University Days, for the Global Marshall Plan the organizational administration. The support and maintenance of local activities through the coordination office, the coordination and communication of speakers and lecturers are additional important component of the commitment of the initiative.

=== Supporters ===
Supporters of the initiative include Hans-Dietrich Genscher, Hubert Weinzierl (BUND), Rita Süssmuth, Ernst Ulrich von Weizsäcker, Franz Josef Radermacher, Jakob von Uexküll, Ulrich Martin Drescher, Renée Ernst, Sandra Maischberger (all from Germany), Josef Riegler, Franz Fischler (Austria), Prince El Hassan bin Talal (Jordan), Vandana Shiva (India), Jane Goodall (UK) and approximately 5000 supporters from Germany and Austria.

The supporting organizations include the Club of Rome, the Eco-Social Europe, the German Federal Association of Economic Development and Foreign Economic Affairs, AIESEC Germany and Austria, Cap Anamur/German Emergency Doctors, VENRO (umbrella organization of development non-governmental organizations), UN Millennium Campaign Germany as well as all the federal states of Austria.

In January 2007 the state parliament of Thuringia became the first national parliament in Germany to commit the goals of the Global Marshall Plan. The parliament paper (Parliament paper 4/2658) also requested the Thuringia state government to support the development of a concrete package of measures for the implementation of the Global Marshall Plan and to raise awareness with prominent example projects and information events in Thuringia as well reporting on progress every three years in state parliament. Since November 2007 the city of Munich has also supported the Global Marshall Plan.

An up-to-date list of supports can be found on the Global Marshall Plan website.

== On a local level ==
Since Spring 2004, a year after the initiative was founded, the local and university groups were founded by supporters in numerous places. The members of these groups stand together for a World in Balance to support the goal of a fairer world. New like-minded people are brought together by getting involved in their area.

The members of predominantly German-speaking areas (Germany, Austria and Switzerland) as well as international operating local groups and individual contact points operate projects for raising awareness. Through bottom-up activities, supporters clear up to those around them topics such as the climate crisis, global poverty and other inequalities to contribute actively towards the necessary changes. With the active announcement of the Global Marshall Plan the supporters understand as lobbying for the common goal – a World in Balance – and act from the center of society, pressurizing politics and the economy.

The Global Marshall Plan University Group was brought to life in 2004 as the first local group. They already organized series of lectures with personalities such as Nobel prize winner Muhammad Yunus and was an incentive and model for other local groups. Currently there are more than 33 contact points worldwide, 23 of which are in German speaking countries acting locally.

== Literature ==
- Al Gore: Wege zum Gleichgewicht. Ein Marshallplan für die Erde. S. Fischer, Frankfurt am Main 1992. ISBN 3-10-027200-5
- Möller, Radermacher, Riegler, Soekadar, Spiegel: GLOBAL MARSHALL PLAN, Statement der Global Marshall Plan Initiative. 64 pages. Foundation basis of the initiative, Horizonte Verlag, 2004, ISBN 3-89483-102-2.
- Global Marshall Plan Initiative (Hrsg.): Hoffnung Europa. Strategie des Miteinanders, Hamburg. 2006.
- Global Marshall Plan Initiative (Hrsg.): Impulse für eine Welt in Balance. Hamburg, 2005.
- Global Marshall Plan Initiative (Hrsg.): Welt in Balance. Zukunftschance Ökosoziale Marktwirtschaft. Hamburg, 2004.
- Huber, Florian J.: Global Governance und der Global Marshall Plan - Strategien, Kritik und Analyse. Saarbrücken, 2007
- Franz Josef Radermacher: Global Marshall Plan. A Planetary Contract. Für eine weltweite Ökosoziale Marktwirtschaft. Hamburg, 2004. (published in both German and English)
- Huschmand Sabet: Globale Maßlosigkeit. Der (un)aufhaltsame Zusammenbruch des weltweiten Mittelstandes. Düsseldorf, 2005.
- Radermacher, F.J.: "Die neue Zukunftsformel" in: bild der wissenschaft. 4, 2002a
- Franz Josef Radermacher, Bernd Beyers: Welt mit Zukunft - Überleben im 21. Jahrhundert. Der Global Marshall Plan als Zukunftsoption. Hamburg, Murmann-Verlag, 2007, ISBN 978-3-938017-86-9
