= Halba =

Halba may refer to:

- Halba, Lebanon, a city in northern Lebanon
- Halba (tribe), an ethnic group of India
- Halba language, a language of India
- Halba (Martian crater)
- Chocolats Halba, a Swiss chocolate producer
- Hilary Halba, New Zealand actress

== See also ==
- Beni Halba tribe, a group in Sudan
- Alba, the Gaelic name for Scotland, of which the inflected form "h-Alba" appears in names
