= Tree Council of Ireland =

Irish non-governmental environmental organisation

- Formation: 1985
- Type: Non-governmental organisation
- Legal status: Charity
- Headquarters: Cabinteely House
- Location: Cabinteely House, The Park, Park Drive, Dublin 18
- Region served: Ireland
- Key people: President: Cormac Downey Vice President: Felicity Gaffney Communications Officer: Éanna Ní Lamhna CEO: Brendan Fitzsimons
- Staff: 2
- Website: treecouncil.ie

The Tree Council of Ireland is a non-profit environmental organisation in Ireland. It was established in 1985 with the purpose of promoting the planting, establishment, and conservation of trees and woodlands throughout Ireland. A voluntary organisation, the Tree Council acts as an umbrella group, bringing together bodies that share a common interest in trees and that work towards achieving the objectives of the Council. The council does not receive any financial support from the government.

== Activities ==
The activities of the Tree Council include the annual organisation of National Tree Week in March and National Tree Day on the first Thursday of October. Additionally, the Tree Council operates a Tree Sponsorship Scheme which enables someone to commemorate a special event, remember a loved one or give the gift of a tree by providing an opportunity to have a tree planted in their name.

The Tree Council is also a strong supporter of the SuperValu Tidy Towns competition sponsoring the Tree Project Award to the value of €1,000 which promotes the planting of the Right Tree in the Right Place.

== Funding ==
The Tree Council is a non-profit organisation which does not receive any financial support from the government. Instead, it relies on support from various sources to continue its voluntary work.

The sources of support include Friends of the Tree Council, annual subscriptions from member organisations, funds from its tree sponsorship scheme, revenue from its publications, and donations from the public.

Equally, an increasing number of companies are collaborating with the Tree Council as they acknowledge the multiple advantages of associating with an environmentally positive organisation.

By doing so, these companies are not only displaying responsible corporate behaviour but also contributing to the development of a better social and cultural environment for trees and woodlands in Ireland.

Collaborating with the Easy Treesie project, the Tree Council of Ireland is working towards the goal of planting a million trees with Ireland's one million school children and their communities. The project is a response to the challenge by Felix Finkbeiner, founder of Plant-for-the-Planet, to the children of the world to plant a million trees in every country as a symbolic and practical act promoting Climate Justice. The project commenced with a pilot project in 2017-2019 and expanded with a national initiative held with Science Foundation Ireland where 30,000 trees were planted nationwide during National Science Week in November 2019. GAA Green Clubs have contributed to achieving this challenge since 2020. The Easy Treesie project presented its 100,000th tree to President Michael D. Higgins in 2021.

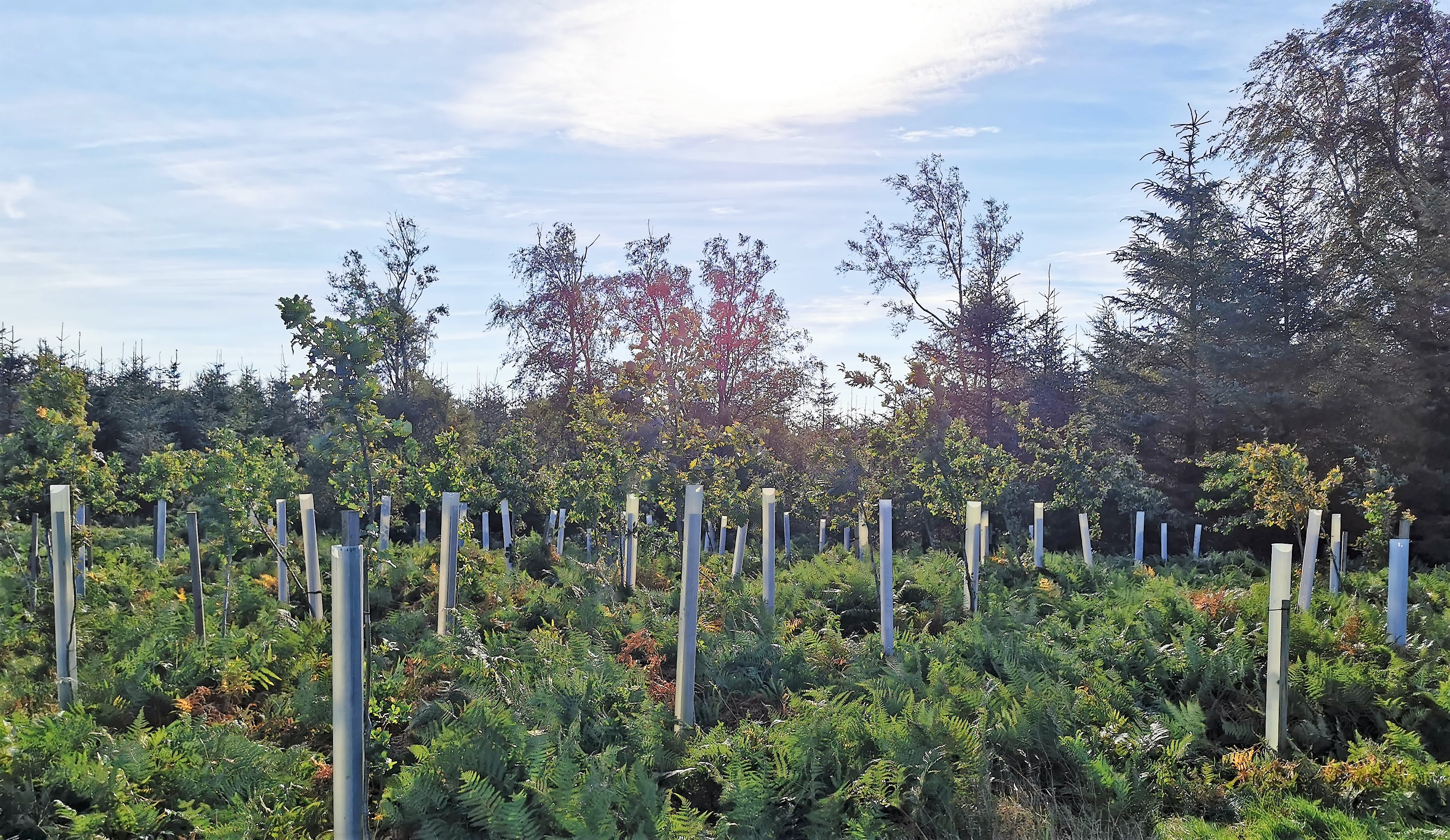
Tree Planting, Aurora, Co. Wicklow

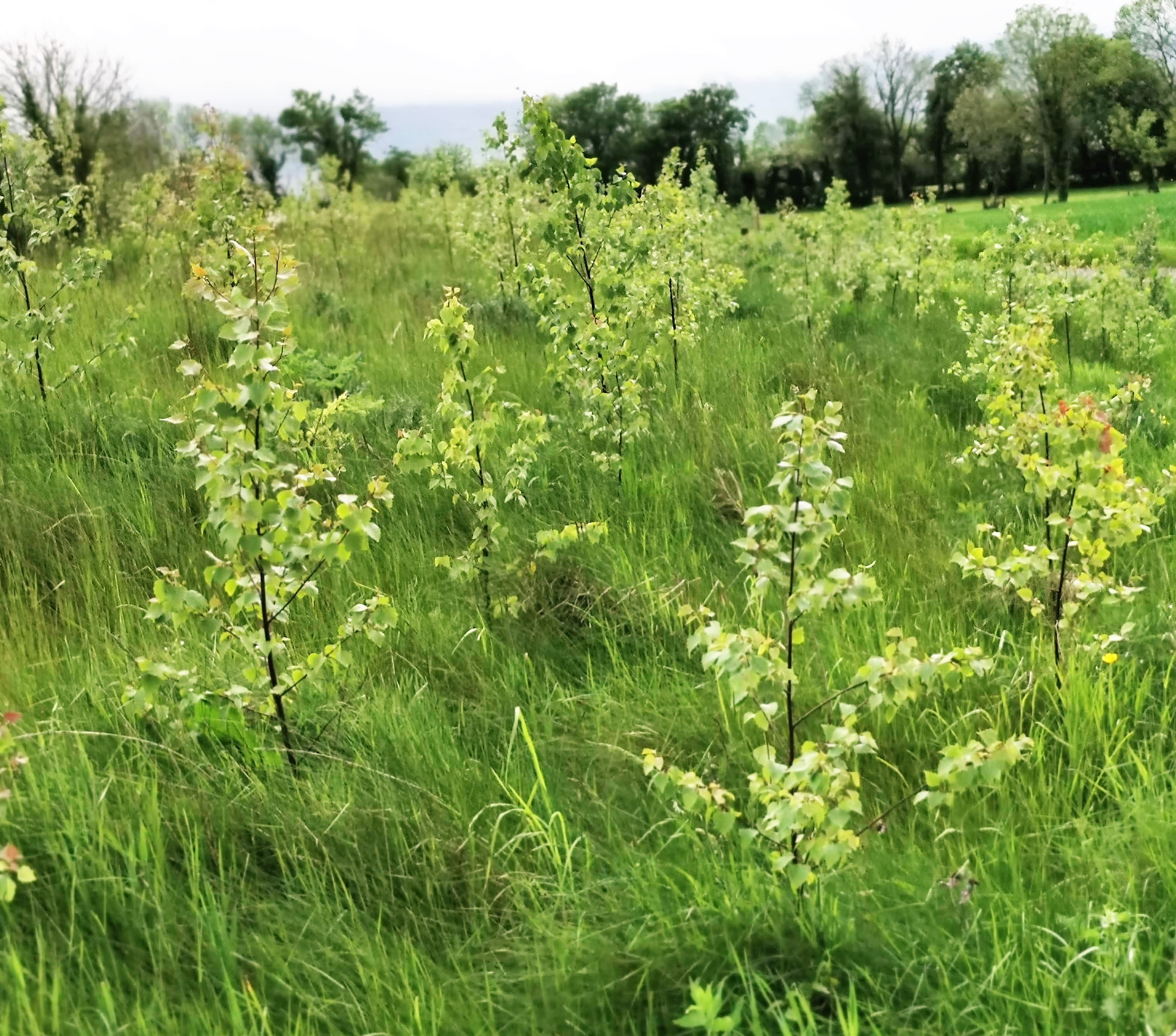
Tree Planting Bansha, Co Tipperary

== Tree Register of Ireland ==
The Tree Register of Ireland (TROI) is a database of Irish trees containing over 10,000 entries. Its compilation was initiated in 1999 by the Tree Council of Ireland and the Irish Tree Society. It contains various details on select trees including their height, girth and location. It was compiled on a Geographic Information System (GIS).

The Heritage Tree Register of Ireland is an extension of the Tree Register of Ireland. It is funded by the Irish Heritage Council, the Tree Council of Ireland, the Irish Tree Society and Crann. To qualify for inclusion on the registry a tree must be considered to be of biological, cultural, ecological or historical interest because of its age, size or condition. In order to keep it reasonably up to date, ideally, 10% of the database should be re-measured every year. However, the updating of this valuable tree resource is restricted due to a lack of funding. The Register is expanding at a rate of approximately 1,000 trees each year.

== See also ==
- Coillte
