= European of the Year (Reader's Digest award) =

Since 1996 the editors of the European editions of the Reader's Digest magazine have named "European of the Year" individuals who best embody the traditions and values of Europe.

- 1996: Roman Catholic Father Imre Kozma, chairman of the Hungarian Malteser Caritas-Service.
- 1997: Norwegian Frederic Hauge, founder of the environmental group Bellona.
- 1998: British solo-skipper Pete Goss, who saved his French friend Raphael Dinelli during a solo yachting competition.
- 1999: Danish Inge Genefke, for her commitment to the treatment and rehabilitation of torture victims.
- 2000: Paul van Buitenen, who uncovered mismanagement within the European Commission.
- 2001: Linus Benedict Torvalds, the inventor of Linux.
- 2002: Eva Joly, former adjudicator in France (among others in the Tapie corruption scandal regarding Elf Aquitaine).
- 2003: Šimon Pánek, founder of People in Need.
- 2004: German jurist Peter Eigen, founder of Transparency International.
- 2005: Russian doctor Leonid Roshal, who mediated in the Beslan school hostage crisis.
- 2006: Ayaan Hirsi Ali, for her support of Muslim females threatened by religious fanatics.
- 2007: Swiss professor Ruedi Lüthy, for his support of African AIDS victims.
- 2008: French economist Maria Nowak, for her micro-credit program.
- 2009: German athlete Joachim Franz, for his global efforts against AIDS.
- 2010: Romanian Iana Matei, for her work to fight forced prostitution in Romania.
- 2011: Doctor Monika Hauser, for her work with sexual-assault victims in war zones.
- 2012: Bulgarian sailor Petar Petrov, who saved 500 people during the Costa Concordia disaster.
- 2013: Polish director of Belsat TV, Agnieszka Romaszewska-Guzy, for providing a voice for Belarus.
- 2014: Swiss entrepreneur and politician Thomas Minder.
- 2015: Felix Finkbeiner (born 1997) founder of the international children and youth initiative Plant-for-the-Planet, to mitigate effects of climate change.
- 2016: Laura Codruța Kövesi (born 1973) current chief prosecutor of Romania's National Anticorruption Directorate.
- 2017: Boyan Slat (born 1994) Dutch inventor, entrepreneur and founder of The Ocean Cleanup.
- 2018: Edit Schlaffer, founder and chairwoman of Women Without Borders
- 2019: Òscar Camps, sea rescue and founder of Proactiva Open Arms
- 2020: Selina Juul, Danish founder and chairman of the board of Stop Wasting Food movement.
- 2021: Petteri Taalas, head of the World Meteorological Organization
