= Landi Schweiz AG =

Swiss retail services and logistics company

- Company type: Public limited company
- Industry: Retail
- Founded: 1978
- Headquarters: Dotzigen, Switzerland
- Area served: Switzerland
- Website: www.landischweiz.ch/en/

Landi Schweiz AG is the national purchasing, logistics and marketing company behind the Landi chain of retail stores in Switzerland. The company is majority-owned by the agricultural cooperative Fenaco and forms part of the Fenaco-Landi group.

== History ==
In 1979 several regional cooperative associations founded UFA Haus & Garten AG in Bern to coordinate purchasing and retail for “house & garden” goods. Additional eastern-Swiss associations created UFA Haus & Garten Pfungen AG in 1984. The two entities merged in 1988 and relocated operations to Dotzigen in 1989. Partnership agreement with the cooperatives followed in 1991. The company adopted the present name Landi Schweiz AG in 1994, shortly after the creation of the fenaco cooperative in 1993.

From the 2000s Landi expanded centralised logistics in Dotzigen, opening a high-bay warehouse in 2008 and an automated container store in 2014. In 2015 fenaco and ZG Raiffeisen launched the cross-border joint venture LahrLogistics in Lahr to support store deliveries.

Landi entered e-commerce in October 2017 with a national online shop. In 2020 fenaco tested the Landi retail concept abroad by taking over the Garden Center Plus in Luxembourg City as a pilot; this store closed in late 2023. Fenaco and ZG Raiffeisen announced a German retail pilot under the brand Landwelt in 2021. In february 2024 fenaco discontinued the project .

== See also ==
- Fenaco
