= Chocolats Halba =

Swiss chocolate company

- Type: Division of Coop Group
- Industry: Chocolate production
- Predecessor: Halba AG
- Founded: May 5, 1933; 93 years ago in Zurich, Switzerland
- Founder: Willy Hallheimer and Werner Baer
- Headquarters: Pratteln (Basel-Landschaft), Switzerland
- Key people: Anton von Weissenfluh
- Products: Chocolate
- Revenue: CHF 135 Mio.
- Number of employees: 278
- Parent: Coop Group
- Website: halba.ch/en.html

Chocolats Halba is a Swiss chocolate producer based in Pratteln (Basel-Landschaft). Chocolate Halba operates its own factory shops, the so-called Schoggihüsli, in Pratteln and at the former factory in Hinwil. It is a division of the retail company Coop and processes around 20,000 tons of chocolate into bars, pralines and Easter bunnies every year. Around 40% of the chocolate is delivered to the Coop Group, the rest goes to third-party customers around the world – including those in Switzerland, Germany, France, Holland, the USA, Canada, New Zealand and China. In addition to the Coop brand Swiss Confisa, they also produce for other brands such as "Die Gute Schokolade" by Plant-for-the-Planet and for the processing industry.

In 2022, Chocolats Halba had annual sales of CHF 285 million. Chocolats Halba generates 90% of its sales with products that carry sustainability labels.

Chocolats Halba generates 73% of its sales with products that carry labels such as Fairtrade Max Havelaar, Bio Suisse, USDA Organic, COR Canada Organic, UTZ or Carbon Neutral Product.

== History ==
The company was founded on May 5, 1933, (the day of the constitutive general meeting; the entry in the commercial register took place on May 19, 1993) by Willy Hallheimer and Werner Baer in Zurich as Halba AG. Hallheimer contributed 18,000 francs of the 30,000 francs start-up capital and gave Baer a pledged loan of 12,000 francs for his share. Production started in Baer's apartment with four employees. In 1955 the company moved to Wallisellen. Halba has been producing for Coop since 1960. In 1967, the two manufacturers Käppeli and SpoSa (formerly Spoerry and Schaufelberger AG, Wald Zürich) were taken over. In 1968, Coop acquired a share of Halba, which was followed by another milestone in 1970, the automation of production. In 1972 the Coop took over Halba completely. At the end of 2000, production moved from Wald Zürich to Hinwil. The company has been called Chocolats Halba since 2003 and has no longer been a company since 2004, but rather a division of Coop. Chocolats Halba was renamed Cocoha AG and then dissolved through a merger with Coop Immobilien AG.

In 2013, Chocolats Halba Honduras AG was founded as the first branch in a developing country. Since summer 2014, Chocolats Halba has only purchased Fair trade-certified cocoa beans.

In 2017, Chocolats Halba moved into its new production facility in Pratteln, near Basel, on the Areal Salina Raurica site which has a production capacity of 15,000 tons per year. The previous locations in Wallisellen and Hinwil were abandoned. The location in Hinwil was taken over by Transgourmet Holding and has been used as a warehouse and sales point. In September 2017, Chocolats Halba was merged with the Coop Sunray division. The new company was named Chocolats Halba / Sunray. Chocolats Halba / Sunray is a member of IG Bio.

== Company ==
Coop owns 75 percent of Chocolats Halba S.A. de C.V. in San Pedro Sula, Honduras. With the “Halba - Le Chocolatier Suisse” product range manufactured by Chocolats Halba, Coop replaced the “Qualité-&-Prix” range in 2021. The new series is in the mid-price segment and is Fairtrade certified.

== Awards ==
In April 2017, the company, together with two other companies, was awarded the highest ranking by the Südwind Institute and the organization Global 2000 in their test for the ecological and social quality of chocolate bunnies.

On April 28, 2018, Chocolats Halba received the Swiss Ethics Award for the "Sustainable Chocolate from Ecuador" project. The joint project by Chocolats Halba and Coop pursues ecominic, ecological and social goals: e.g. the increase in living standards, biodiversity and the integration and promotion of young farmers.

== Collaborations ==
Together with Fairtrade Africa, Chocolats Halba supports a project against the deforestation of the forests of West Africa. The project supports 2,500 farmers in converting their cocoa monocultures into mixed crops. In collaboration with the children and youth initiative Plant-for-the-Planet, Halba produces “good chocolate”. Halba forgoes any profit; the money generated is instead used for reforestation projects in Mexico.

== See also ==
- Swiss chocolate
