= Felix Finkbeiner =

German environmentalist

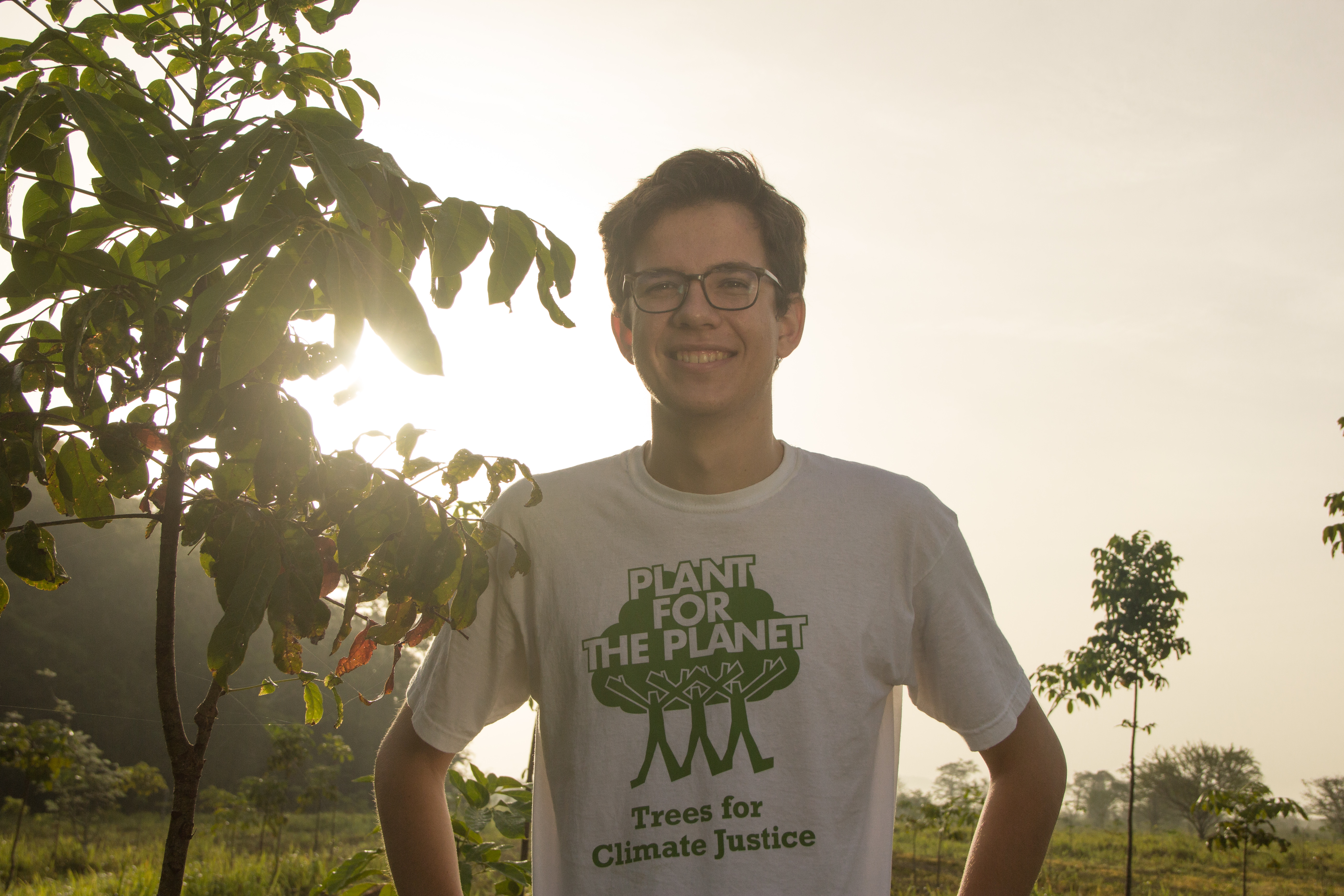
- Finkbeiner at the Yucatán Reforestation Project (2018)
- Born: 8 October 1997 (age 28); Munich, Germany
- Known for: Founding Plant-for-the-Planet
- Website: plant-for-the-planet.org

Felix Finkbeiner (born 8 October 1997) is a German environmentalist and the founder of the international tree-planting and environmental advocacy organization Plant-for-the-Planet.

== Life and education ==
Finkbeiner is son of Frithjof Finkbeiner (businessman, activist and member of the Club of Rome) and Karolin Finkbeiner (textile engineer), with two sisters. He attended Munich International School from which he graduated in 2015. After living in London for three years, he graduated with a BA in International Relations from SOAS, University of London in 2018. Since September 2018, he is a PhD student of environmental sciences at the Crowther Lab of ETH Zürich, where he studies the most effective approaches to forest restoration under Tom Crowther.

== Plant-for-the-Planet ==
In January 2007, when Finkbeiner was nine years old and in fourth grade, inspired by hearing of Nobel laureate Wangari Maathai, he gave a class presentation on global warming in which he suggested to classmates that children should plant one million trees in each country of the world. Together with many of his classmates, Felix planted a tree on 28 March 2007 and launched Plant-for-the-Planet. After three years, the initiative planted its millionth tree. At age 10, he spoke in the European Parliament and at age 13 at the UN General Assembly. He also Joined the UN's Environment Programme Children's Board.

A decade later, he leads an organisation with 130 employees internationally and 70,000 members in 67 countries. Plant-for-the-Planet has hosted over 1,200 Academies during which participants between 10 and 14 learn about global warming and the importance of trees, practice public speaking and make plans on how they want to contribute to tackling global warming. Felix regularly attends Plant-for-the-Planet global youth summits as a speaker and as a moderator, most recently at the Frankfurt Youth Summit in October 2023.

The organisation currently restores 22,500 hectares of forest on the Yucatán Peninsula in Mexico by planting on average one tree every 15 seconds. Furthermore, Plant-for-the-Planet leads the UN Billion Tree Campaign, as part of which 14 billion trees have been planted so far by contributing companies, organisations and governments.

Plant-for-the-Planet's The Change Chocolate ("Die Gute Schokolade") is sold in 20,000 stores throughout Germany and Austria. The chocolate is Fair Trade and carbon neutral. The profits are used to fund the tree-planting efforts in Yucatán. Thus, with every five bars sold, one tree is planted.

== Honours and awards ==
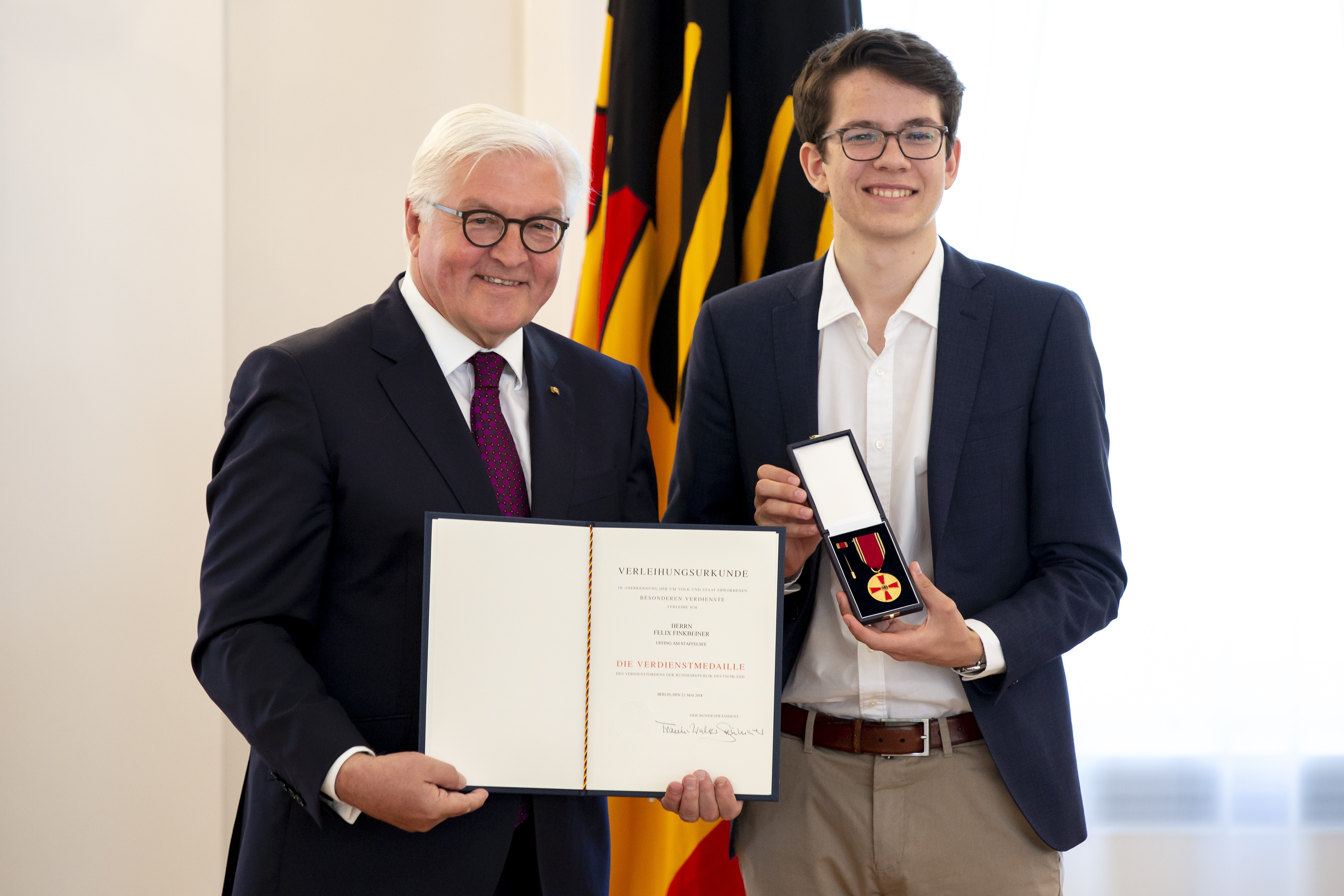
Felix Finkbeiner receives the Order of Merit of the Federal Republic of Germany from President of Germany Frank-Walter Steinmeier

- 2018 Order of Merit of the Federal Republic of Germany, awarded by President of Germany Frank-Walter Steinmeier
- 2018 Focus Magazine's Person Most Likely to Shape the Next 25 Years
- 2016 One of JCI's Ten Outstanding Young Persons of the World
- 2015 Reader's Digest's European of the Year
- 2014 German Culture Award
- 2013 Bavarian Parliament's Citizen Culture Award
- 2011 One of Focus Magazine's 100 most influential Germans
- 2011 One of The Guardian's 20 Green Giants
- 2009 Bavaria's State-Medal for Environmental Merits
