= Eco-social market economy =

Environmental socio-economic model

The eco-social market economy (ESME), also known as the socio-ecological market economy (SEME) or social and ecological market economy, aims at balancing free market economics, striving for social fairness, and the sustainable use and protection of natural resources. Developed by Austrian politician Josef Riegler during the 1980s, it expands on the original concept of the social market economy—an economic model first advocated by Konrad Adenauer—and is considered the economic format that is followed by the majority of European nations.

== Definition and aims ==
The eco-social market economy is a holistic model based on a strong and innovative market economy. The eco-social market economy requires that the protection of the environment and social fairness are vital criteria for all economic activity. The protection of the ecology and habitat for future generations are central issues for eco-social market economies. Its supporters maintain that free markets alone are not able or interested to protect the environment, hence government action is necessary. The creation of higher social and environmental standards, especially in developing countries, is seen as a vital step towards world peace in the future. The eco-social market economy aims at "higher chances for the brave, more solidarity and more responsibility for natural habitats".

== Proposed measures ==
Frameworks and Guidelines for fair competition must be implemented, not only in the EU, but on a global level. It is a foremost demand to politics to create such a political landscape of global connectivity and cooperation. Eco-social market economists support the implementation of the Millennium Development Goals and the Kyoto Protocol, and demand stronger cooperation between the United Nations, the World Trade Organization, the International Monetary Fund and the International Labour Organization to create the said framework. On a national level, it favours higher taxes on fossil-fuel energy sources (environmental taxes), while at the same time lowering income taxes. Public subsidies must, in their opinion, only be paid to promote sustainability. Environmental pollution and resource use must be included in the calculation of product processes and in product prices. A strong emphasis in education about issues on environmental protection are seen as being absolutely necessary to create market awareness.

== Global Marshall Plan initiative ==
The idea of a global marshall plan, first brought forward by Al Gore in the 1990s, is a main part of eco-social thinking. The idea of a Global Marshall Plan is based on two pillars:

1. Innovative additional fundraising required for the actual realisation of the UN Millennium Development Goals on the basis of partnerships, co-responsibility and good governance.
2. The achievement of a global eco-social market economy by means of implementing the same ecological and social standards in all institutes and agreements on a global scale.

The funding of these development measures are a levy on financial transactions, a kerosene tax or special drawing rights with the IMF. The big challenge is finding an effective way of translating money into development without losing to corruption worldwide.

Among the prominent supporters of the initiative are Muhammad Yunus, Hans-Dietrich Genscher, Ernst Ulrich von Weizsäcker and Jane Goodall.

== See also ==
- Carbon fee and dividend
- Eco-capitalism
- Eco-socialism
- Ecological economics
