= Billion Tree Tsunami =

Tree-planting campaign in Pakistan

- Commercial?: No
- Type of project: Afforestation
- Location: Khyber Pakhtunkhwa, Pakistan
- Ministry: Ministry of Climate Change
- Key people: Imran Khan, Malik Amin Aslam
- Established: 2014
- Launched: 2 September 2018; 7 years ago
- Budget: Rs. 109.38 billion (US$390 million)
- Website: mocc.gov.pk

The Billion Tree Tsunami was a tree plantation drive launched in 2014, by the government of Khyber Pakhtunkhwa, Pakistan, in response to the challenge of global warming. Pakistan's Billion Tree Tsunami restores 350,000 hectares of forests and degraded land to surpass its Bonn Challenge commitment. The project aimed at improving the ecosystems of classified forests, as well as privately owned waste and farm lands, and therefore entails working in close collaboration with concerned communities and stakeholders to ensure their meaningful participation through effectuating project promotion and extension services. The project was completed in August 2017, ahead of schedule.

== Inspiration ==
The Billion Tree Tsunami Project is driven by the Government of Khyber Pakhtunkhwa’s vision of green growth which ties in the needs for sustainable forestry development, generating green jobs, gender empowerment, preserving Pakistan’s natural capital while also addressing the global issue of climate change.

== Afforestation regions ==
The Billion Tree Tsunami covers the whole province of Khyber Pakhtunkhwa.

Region	Division
Central-Southern Forest Region-I Peshawar	Dera Ismail Khan; Bannu; Kohat; Peshawar; Mardan
Northern Forest Region-II Abbottabad	Haripur; Agror Tanawal; Tor Ghar; Gallies; Siran; Kaghan; Hazara Tribal; Lower Kohistan; Upper Kohistan; Daur Watershed; Kohistan Watershed; Unhar Watershed; Kunhar Watershed; Buner Watershed
Northern Forest Region-III Malakand	Malakand; Buner; Lower Dir; Swat; Alpuri; Kalam; Upper Dir; Dir Kohistan; Chitral

== 10 Billion Tree Tsunami ==
On 3 September 2018, after becoming Prime Minister of Pakistan following the 2018 Pakistani general election, Imran Khan launched a 5-year, country-wide 10 billion tree plantation drive from Makhniyal, KPK to combat the effects of global warming. Its total cost is estimated at 125.1843 billion Pakistani rupees.

== Corruption inquiry ==
In January 2020, the National Accountability Bureau started an inquiry on alleged loss of 462 million rupees (approximately US$3 million) in connection with an inquiry it had launched in March 2018. Allegations included ghost labour, embezzlement, and misappropriation. The Bureau recommended an enhancement of the inquiry to establish whether further losses have occurred. In 2016 the World Wide Fund for Nature (WWF) had published a third party audit report for all the project's phases.

== International appreciation ==
The billion tree program was appreciated by United Nations Environment Programme (UNEP), according to their statement “We are at a point in history where we need to act and Pakistan is leading on this important effort.” World Economic Forum praised adding 350,000 hectares of trees. Furthermore, congratulated Pakistan for reaching target of billion trees ahead of schedule. Pakistan exceeded its Bonn challenge commitment, Khyber Pakhtunkhwa a province in Pakistan became the first international entity to complete the challenge, on success of Bonn challenge Head of International Union for Conservation of Nature (IUCN)'s Inger Anderson dubbed the project as “a true conservation success story”. Based on international appreciation Saudi Arabia contacted government of Pakistan to plants 10 billion trees in their country.

== See also ==
- Trillion Tree Campaign, a UNEP call to plant billions of trees.
- Plant for Pakistan, a follow-up reforestation project.
- Team Trees, international tree planting campaign
