= Munich International School =

Coordinates: 48.0015°N 11.3829°E

- MIS
- Starnberg, Bayern; Germany

Information
- Type: International school
- Established: 1966
- Founder: Mr. George Snyder
- Head of School: Timothy Thomas
- Deputy Head of School: Oliver Hartwright
- Grades: 1–12 (EC 4–5, EC 5–6)
- Enrollment: 1200 (approx.)
- Campus: Schloß Buchhof
- Colors: Blue, White
- Mascot: Wildcat
- Accreditation: IBO, NEASC
- Newspaper: Buchhof Bulletin
- Yearbook: Different Every Year
- Website: mis-munich.de

Munich International School (MIS) is a private coeducational international school located in Starnberg, approximately 20 kilometres (12 mi) south-west of Munich, Germany. MIS teaches students from EC (Early Child - years 4-5), Junior School, Middle School (grade 5-8) and Senior School. Students can commute from approximately 80% of areas where students reside via a school bus network.

MIS is an accredited International Baccalaureate (IB) World School. Lessons are taught in English, and German is the compulsory second language. MIS offers further third language options.

The current head of the school is Timothy Thomas.

== Academics ==
MIS offers all three programmes of the International Baccalaureate Organisation (IBO) - International Baccalaureate Primary Years Programme (IBPYP), International Baccalaureate Middle Years Programme (IBMYP), IB Diploma Programme (IBDP).

== School organization ==
The school is divided into three sections and each is overseen by a principal:

- Junior School (EC 4/5 to Grade 4)
- Middle School (Grades 5 to 8)
- Senior School (Grades 9 to 12)

== Facilities ==
The school offers a range of facilities including science labs, football fields, gyms, basketball courts, tennis courts and class-rooms. There are a track and field stadium, a language, arts and design complex, and a makers’ laboratory.

== Athletics ==
Munich International School has competitive sports teams from grades 5-12. As of 2022 the school's competitive sports teams offered are football, volleyball, basketball, tennis, track and field, rugby, softball, swimming, cross-country, golf and skiing.

== History ==
The school was founded on September 19, 1966. In that first school year it welcomed 120 students. It moved to the location in Starnberg in 1968. On the school site is Schloss Buchhof, a former castle which houses administrative offices.

== Notable alumni ==
- Princess Leonille zu Sayn-Wittgenstein (Actress, daughter of Sunnyi Melles)
- Prince Constantin Victor Ludwig zu Sayn-Wittgenstein (DJ Wittgenstein) Music Producer & DJ, son of Sunnyi Melles)
- Prince Alfons of Liechtenstein (financial analyst)
- Felix Finkbeiner (Founder of Plant for the Planet, German environmentalist)
- Annabelle von Theumer (Actress, Munich Socialite, Senior Consultant Pharma & Biotech)
