= Thomas Crowther (ecologist) =

British ecologist (born 1986)

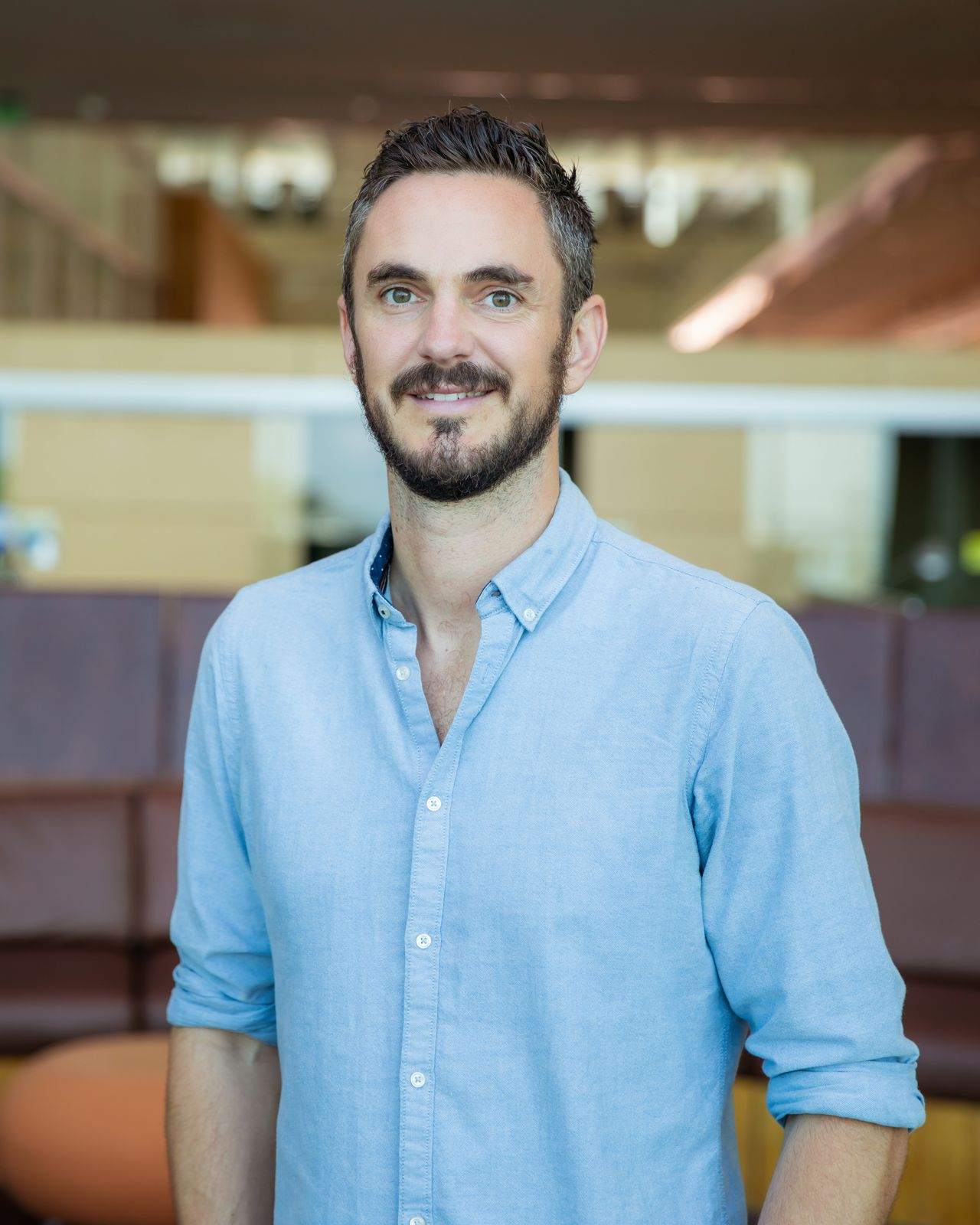
- Thomas W Crowther in 2026
- Born: June 18, 1986 (age 40)
- Known for: Global biodiversity and restoration ecology
- Scientific career
- Workplaces: BRANCH, Biodiversity Research and Action for Nature, Climate and Humanity, Switzerland; ETH Zürich, Switzerland; Yale University, USA; Cardiff University, UK
- Website: crowtherlab.com

Thomas Ward Crowther is a professor of global ecology, author, and founding co-chair of the Advisory Board for the United Nations Decade on Ecosystem Restoration. He is best known for research on global tree counts and restoration potential that underpinned the Trillion Tree Campaign. His work has been featured in films including ‘From Devil’s Breath’ and ‘Secrets of the Forest’. His 2026 book, Nature’s Echo, has been described as providing a scientific basis for global environmental optimism.

Crowther’s science explores avenues for large-scale social and ecological regeneration. In 2020, he founded Restor, an online platform that operates as “the Google Maps for nature”.

Crowther is the Chair of the BRANCH Institute, which coordinates an international network of scientists across 6 leading universities around the world, and the World Economic Forum recognised him as a Young Global Leader for his work on biodiversity protection.

== Career ==
Crowther conducted his undergraduate and PhD studies at Cardiff University, under the supervision of Dr. Hefin Jones. Following his PhD, Crowther received a postdoctoral fellowship from the Climate and Energy Institute at Yale University. In 2015, Crowther was awarded a Marie Curie fellowship to research the impact of carbon cycle feedbacks on climate change at the Netherlands Institute of Ecology (NIOO).

In 2017, Crowther obtained a tenure track professorship at ETH Zürich. In 2024, accusations of personal and financial misconduct were made against Crowther. Crowther denied any wrongdoing. A subsequent 'clarification' by ETH Zürich found that Crowther had "blurred boundaries" in the lab, allegedly "treating his employees in the same way as friends", and breached internal budgeting rules, resulting in the university deciding not to extend his contract.

Following ETH Zürich's decision, dozens of current and former lab members came out in public support of Crowther, criticizing the university for an ‘unfair, biased, distorted’ investigation process. An in-depth investigative journalism article by the Neue Zürcher Zeitung (NZZ) strongly criticized the university for the improper handling of the case. The Swiss Press Award 2026 later highlighted the NZZ article, concluding that ETH Zürich ultimately did "not come off well" in the matter. ETH Zürich acknowledged that there was "information that contradicts parts of the statements made by the three individuals" whose allegations formed the basis of the original investigation and cleared him of serious financial misconduct, but maintained its decision not to extend Crowther’s contract.

After leaving ETH Zürich, Crowther – along with members of his former lab – founded the BRANCH Institute, a Swiss non-profit foundation, to continue their work on global biodiversity protection. In 2025, he obtained a full professorship at King Abdullah University of Science and Technology. In 2026, Crowther released his debut book, Nature’s Echo, published by Penguin and Harper Horizon.

== Research ==
Crowther is a leader in the field of global biodiversity research. His work is best known for helping to develop the field of global restoration ecology. This work has formed the scientific motivation for international conservation and restoration initiatives including the UN Decade on Ecosystem Restoration, and the Trillion Tree Campaigns of the World Economic Forum, WWF and UNEP.

His early work focused on soil biodiversity and their interactions with plants. In the journal Science, he stressed that "soil organisms represent the most biologically diverse community on land". His research has mapped the distribution of mycorrhizal fungi and nematodes across global soils, revealing the importance of these soil organisms for global carbon cycling. Crowther's work highlights how warming of soils can increase the rates of carbon emissions from soil. In 2016, Crowther's research suggested that warming might stimulate the activity of soil organisms in high-latitude arctic and sub-arctic soils, leading to the loss of 30 Gt of carbon by 2050, which could accelerate climate change by 12-17%. Crowther stresses that protecting the soil community might be one of the best way to buffer ecosystems against these potential impacts of climate change.

In 2015, Crowther led an international team to show that the Earth is home to approximately 3.04 trillion trees. The research also estimated that humans have reduced that number by almost half, and Earth continues to lose around 10 billion trees each year. Ongoing research on global forests also showed that there are over 79,000 tree species in the global forest system, and that the productivity of forests increases as species diversity increases.

Crowther's work has estimated the global tree restoration potential, showing that there are 0.9 billion hectares of land where trees would naturally be able to grow outside of urban and agricultural land. If this land could be protected, the study suggested that this is room for one trillion new trees, and the recovering ecosystems could capture over 205 Gt carbon. Crowther has described nature restoration as one of the most effective carbon drawdown strategies to date, with the potential to help people, biodiversity, and climate.

A number of scientists criticized the idea that planting trees across the globe is a simple solution to climate change. In particular, several articles suggested that it is dangerous and misleading to propose that tree planting can be a silver bullet to stop climate change. Crowther agreed with those criticisms, stating that ecosystem restoration cannot be used as an excuse to ignore the challenges of cutting greenhouse gas emissions and protecting existing ecosystems. He also emphasized that ecosystem restoration is not simply about planting trees for carbon capture. Instead, it is about the many solutions that promote the protection, regeneration and sustainable management of nature for local people and the biodiversity that they depend on. Crowther warned about the risks of mass tree plantations, highlighting the need for socially and ecologically responsible restoration of ecosystems across the globe.

Following this work, Crowther teamed up with 220 scientists to create the Integrated Forest Assessment. They showed that the conservation and recovery of diverse forests can account for roughly 1/3 of our climate change mitigation requirements, providing empirical data to support the commitments made under the Kunming-Montreal Global Biodiversity Framework and the Glasgow Leaders Declaration on Forests and Land Use.

== Tech for nature ==
In a 2020 TED Talk, Crowther announced the development of an online platform for the conservation and restoration of nature. Described as a "Google Maps for nature," Restor is an online open data platform and not-for-profit organization that provides ecological data, transparency, and connectivity to nature-based solutions. In 2021, Restor was a finalist for the Royal Foundation's Earthshot Prize in the Protect and Restore Nature category. As of 2025, the platform connected and supported more than 225,000 conservation and restoration projects worldwide.

As part of his research, Crowther compiled a large inventory of tree data based on a combination of satellite observations and on-the-ground ecological research. In 2016 he co-founded the Global Forest Biodiversity Initiative (GFBI), which manages the world's largest tree-level forest inventory database with over 30 million observations of tree measurements from 1.2 million locations around the world. The database was used to identify that across the global forest system, a greater number of tree species consistently leads to increases in the carbon storage of local forests, even with the same number of trees.

Crowther is also the founder of SEED, a tool that allows organizations to assess the complexity of life at any location on Earth.

== Policy and engagement ==
Based on the global tree potential research, the World Economic Forum (WEF) launched its Trillion Trees initiative in January 2020 in partnership with Lynne and Marc Benioff. Benioff later described Crowther as the "Steve Jobs of ecology" for his role in driving global ecological recovery. Crowther now serves on the advisory board of 1T.org. In 2021, Crowther Lab was appointed as a supporting partner to the UN Decade on Ecosystem Restoration, and Crowther served as a founding co-chair of the advisory board for the Decade on Ecosystem Restoration.

The research has also featured in the United Nations' Trillion Tree campaign and a similar initiative with the same name led by WWF and BirdLife international, which aims to protect and regenerate 1 trillion trees within healthy ecosystems across the globe.
