= Earth in the Balance =

1992 book by Al Gore

- Earth in the Balance audio book cover
- Author: Al Gore
- Published: June 1992 Houghton Mifflin
- Pages: 407
- ISBN: 978-0395578216

Earth in the Balance: Ecology and the Human Spirit (ISBN 0-452-26935-0, paperback ISBN 1-85383-743-1) is a 1992 book written by Al Gore, published in June 1992, shortly before he was elected Vice President in the 1992 presidential election. Known by the short title Earth in the Balance, the book purports to explain the world's ecological predicament and describes a range of policies to deal with what Gore claims are the most pressing problems. It includes a proposed "Global Marshall Plan" to address these ecological issues.

Written while his son was recovering from a serious accident, Earth in the Balance became the first book written by a sitting U.S. Senator to make the New York Times bestseller list since John F. Kennedy's 1956 Profiles in Courage.

In 1993, Earth in the Balance was released in paperback and audiobook format on audio cassette tape.

It received the Robert F. Kennedy Center for Justice and Human Rights 1993 Book Award given annually to a book that "most faithfully and forcefully reflects Robert Kennedy's purposes - his concern for the poor and the powerless, his struggle for honest and even-handed justice, his conviction that a decent society must assure all young people a fair chance, and his faith that a free democracy can act to remedy disparities of power and opportunity."

The book was followed by An Inconvenient Truth, a book that was the companion for a movie narrated by Al Gore, shown at the 2006 Sundance Film Festival and released on 24 May 2006.

In the 2002 Futurama episode "Crimes of the Hot", Al Gore himself references the book and its "far more popular" fictional future sequel, Harry Potter and the Balance of Earth.

== Global Marshall Plan ==
The Global Marshall Plan is a plan first devised by former American Vice-President Al Gore in his bestselling book Earth in the Balance, which gives specific ideas on how to save the global environment.

Gore states: "The model of the Marshall Plan can be of great help. For example, a Global Marshall Plan must focus on strategic goals and emphasize actions and programs that are likely to remove the bottlenecks presently inhibiting the healthy functioning of the global economy. The new global economy must be an inclusive system that does not leave entire regions behind. The new plan will require the wealthy nations to allocate money for transferring environmentally helpful technologies to the Third World and to help impoverished nations achieve a stable population and a new pattern of sustainable economic progress. To work, however, any such effort will also require wealthy nations to make a transition themselves that will be in some ways more wrenching than that of the Third World."

Source: Earth in the Balance, page 297-301

Global Marshall Plan: Five strategic goals "In my view, five strategic goals must direct and inform our efforts to save the global environment":

- stabilizing of world population
- the rapid development of environmentally appropriate technologies
- a comprehensive change in the economic "rules of the road" by which we measure the impact of our decisions on the environment
- negotiation & approval of a new generation of international agreements
- a cooperative plan for educating the world's citizens about our global environment.

The idea is based on the post-WWII Marshall Plan that saw the United States send billions of dollars to European nations to rebuild their war shattered economies.

In order to further the idea of a GMP and to coordinate the various initiatives, NGOs, scientists, activists and groups in the field of development cooperation and global social justice the Global Marshall Plan Initiative was founded by members of the Club of Rome, the Club of Budapest, the Eco-Social Forum Europe, ATTAC and other organisations in Frankfurt, Germany in 2003. The two main objectives are to find new ways and sources of financing in development cooperation, predominantly pursuing the Millennium Development Goals of the UN and the worldwide propagation of the eco-social market economy, which is considered to be one of today's key strategies of initiative.

== Opposition to adaptation ==
In the book Gore expresses opposition to adaptation to global warming, writing that adaptation represented a “kind of laziness, an arrogant faith in our ability to react in time to save our skins”.

== Editions ==
- Gore, Al, Earth in the Balance: Ecology and the Human Spirit, 1992, Houghton Mifflin, Boston, MA, hardcover, 416 pages, ISBN 0-395-57821-3.
- Gore, Al, Earth in the Balance: Ecology and the Human Spirit, 2000-04-22, Houghton Mifflin, Boston, MA, hardcover, 416 pages, ISBN 0-618-05664-5.
- Gore, Al, Earth in the Balance: Ecology and the Human Spirit, New edition, 2000-07-26, Earthscan Publications Ltd., paperback, 440 pages, ISBN 1-85383-743-1.
- Gore, Al, Earth in the Balance: Ecology and the Human Spirit, New foreword, 2006, Rodale, Inc., paperback, 408 pages, ISBN 978-1-59486-637-1.

== See also ==
- Global Marshall Plan Initiative
