= Trillion Tree Campaign =

Campaign to plant one trillion trees

- Formation: 2018
- Founded at: Grimaldi Forum, Monaco
- Fields: Reforestation; nature conservation
- Official language: English, German, Spanish, French, Portuguese
- Parent organization: Plant-for-the-Planet
- Affiliations: UNEP
- Website: trilliontreecampaign.org
- Formerly called: Billion Tree Campaign

The Trillion Tree Campaign is a project which aims to plant one trillion trees worldwide. It seeks to repopulate the world's trees and combat climate change as a nature-based solution. The project was launched at PlantAhead 2018 in Monaco by Plant-for-the-Planet. In the fall of 2018, the project's official website was published in order to register, monitor, and donate trees to reforestation projects around the world. The campaign is a continuation of the activities of the earlier Billion Tree Campaign, instigated by Wangari Maathai, who founded the Green Belt Movement in Africa in 1977.

As of 30 May 2021, 164 restoration projects participate in the campaign and 13.96 billion (1.396% of the goal) trees have been planted worldwide.

== History ==
=== Billion Tree Campaign ===
The Green Belt Movement began its activity in Africa in 1977, eventually planting more than 30 million trees. The Billion Tree Campaign was inspired by Nobel Peace Prize laureate Wangari Maathai, founder of the Green Belt Movement. When an executive in the United States told Maathai their corporation was planning to plant a million trees, her response was: "That's great, but what we really need is to plant a billion trees."

The project was launched in 2006 by the United Nations Environment Programme (UNEP) under the patronage of Prince Albert II of Monaco and the World Agroforestry Centre-ICRAF as a response to the challenges of climate change, as well as to a wider array of sustainability challenges from water supply to biodiversity loss, and achieved the initial target of planting a billion trees in 2007. The billionth tree, commonly known as an African olive, was planted in Ethiopia in November 2007. In 2008, the campaign's objective was raised to 7 billion trees, a goal which was surpassed three months before its target of the climate change conference that was held in Copenhagen, Denmark, in December 2009.

The 2-billionth tree took root as part of the United Nations World Food Programme agroforestry initiative. The campaign's target was then raised to seven billion trees. In 2009, UNEP mobilized action across the globe through the "Twitter for Trees" campaign. UNEP pledged to plant one tree to feed into the Billion Tree Campaign for every follower who joined from 5 May 2009 to World Environment Day on 5 June 2009. The campaign was a success, with 10,300 people following the page by World Environment Day.

The World Organization of the Scout Movement also planted trees under the campaign, in line with its mandate to study and protect nature across several countries. United Nations Peacekeeping missions also joined the campaign and planted trees within their field missions in East Timor, Ivory Coast, Darfur, Lebanon, Haiti, Congo, and Liberia, among others.

=== After the campaign ===
Felix Finkbeiner addressed the United Nations in a speech to open the International Year of Forests 2011, saying: "It is now time that we work together. We combine our forces, old and young, rich and poor; and together, we can plant a trillion trees. We can start the Trillion Tree Campaign." In December 2011, after more than 12 billion trees had been planted, UNEP formally handed management of the program to the youth-led not-for-profit Plant-for-the-Planet Foundation (an organisation that had been participating in the Billion Tree Campaign since 2007), based in Tutzing, Germany. Momentum has since continued, with 40,000 young ambassadors spreading the message in over 100 countries.

In 2015, researcher Tom Crowther found that about 3 trillion trees exist in the world and later it was also estimated that planting 1.2 trillion more trees would counteract 10 years of anthropogenic CO_{2} emissions.

In 2017, Pakistan's Billion Tree Tsunami restored 350,000 hectares of forests.

On 9 March 2018, the Trillion Tree Declaration was signed at the Grimaldi Forum in Monaco. Signatories include Prince Albert II of Monaco, Gyalwang Drukpa, Patricia Espinosa in collaboration with the WWF, WCS, and BirdLife International.

In September 2019, the Plant-for-the-Planet app was released under an open-source license. It allowed users to register planted trees or to plant trees by donating to different tree-planting organizations around the world. The foundation does not take any commissions for donations made through the campaign.

=== One Trillion Tree initiative ===
The 2020 World Economic Forum, held in Davos, announced the creation of the One Trillion Tree initiative platform for governments, businesses, and civil society to provide support to the UN Decade on Ecosystem Restoration (2020–2030), led by UNEP and FAO. Forum participant Donald Trump, then-president of the United States, announced that the government of the U.S. would commit to the initiative.

== Principles ==
- Reducing fossil fuel emissions
- Conserving existing ecosystems
- Restoration must be socially and ecologically responsible

== By country ==
=== China ===
In the years 2011—2022, China restored more than 70 million hectares (700,000 km^{2}) of forests. The nation committed to plant and conserve 70 billion trees by the year 2030 as part of the Trillion Tree Campaign.

=== US ===
The United States has pledged to plant, grow, and restore around 51 billion trees by the year 2030. Currently, forests in the country absorb 15% of its carbon emissions. This can rise to 27% with responsible reforestation.

== See also ==
- Ecosia

== Bibliography ==
- Ian Horswill — Ethiopia plants 353 million trees in 12 hours, published by CEO Magazine 30 July 2019
- Project Drawdown
