= Plant for Pakistan =

Environmental protection campaign in Pakistan

Plant for Pakistan (Plant4Pakistan), also known as 10 Billion Tree Tsunami, was a five-year project to plant 10 billion trees across Pakistan from 2018 to 2023. Prime Minister Imran Khan started the drive on 2 September 2018 with approximately 1.5 million trees planted on the first day. The campaign was based on the successful Billion Tree Tsunami campaign of the former Pakistan Tehreek-e-Insaf government, also led by Imran Khan, in the province of Khyber Pakhtunkhwa in 2014. This different initiative is often confused with the initiative of the Prime Minister Mian Muhammad Nawaz Sharif who launched a national campaign of Green Pakistan and also allocated budget funding from the PSDP.

In 2020, the program tripled its number of workers to 63,600 after being momentarily halted following the COVID-19 pandemic in Pakistan, aiming to enlist those left unemployed by its economic consequences.

Most of the work, which paid between 500 and 800 rupees (US$3–5) a day, took place in rural areas, with people setting up nurseries, planting saplings, and serving as forest protection guards. The plan was awarded 7.5 billion rupees ($46m) in funding. Saplings planted during the initiative included mulberry, acacia, moringa and other indigenous species.

== History ==
The Billion Tree Tsunami was a massive afforestation initiative launched by the Khyber Pakhtunkhwa government in Pakistan in 2014. The project aimed to plant one billion trees on 35,000 hectares of degraded forest and barren land. Its success quickly gained international recognition, with organizations like the Bonn Challenge, the World Bank, and the IUCN praising its environmental impact.

Inspired by the original project, Prime Minister Imran Khan initiated a similar, larger-scale effort, the 10 Billion Tree Tsunami, in 2018. This initiative sought to reforest one million hectares across Pakistan. The project has garnered significant global attention and has inspired similar efforts in other countries. While progress has been substantial, with over one billion trees planted in the initial years, the ambitious goal of planting nine billion more within the remaining timeframe presents a significant challenge. However, given the international support and domestic momentum behind the project, it is anticipated that the 10 Billion Tree Tsunami will be successfully completed.

== Global warming in Pakistan ==
While Pakistan's economy is 135th in terms of greenhouse gas emissions, it is among the top ten countries in the world to be affected by global warming according to the annual report of Global Climate Risk Index of German Watch, which ranks Pakistan as eighth among the countries most at risk of climate change. As of November 2021, Lahore is the number one in the world in terms of air pollution. Major cities have experienced major heat waves and high levels of pollution in the 21st century, including Karachi and Islamabad.

Pakistan has a wide variety of ecosystems within its borders, including the Arabian sea, several deserts and major rivers, and more than seven thousand glaciers. Pakistan is also at the confluence of three great mountain ranges; the Hindu Kush, the Himalayas and the Karakoram. Areas such as Sindh province are at increased risk of flooding due to the melting of glaciers and the eruption of glacial lakes, while also being at risk of drought due to an increasingly warm dry season. Threats such as hurricanes also pose an increasing threat to open populations.

== The 'Safe Areas' system ==
Apart from tree planting, the Government of Pakistan had also taken other eco-friendly measures, including increasing the number of protected areas; as of December 2022, there were currently 398 wildlife conservation areas in Pakistan. Of these, 31 had national park status. The total protected land area represented 13% of Pakistan's landmass as of 2020, with the government of Pakistan announcing plans to increase this amount to 15% by 2023.

A National Park Academy had been planned for Ziarat and Balochistan national parks, where young people would be given jobs after special training, with plans to give at least 5,000 young people employment.

== Other Green Projects ==
=== Green energy ===
The government had immediately abandoned 2600 MW coal burning projects and focused on new 3700 MW hydropower projects instead. Such power projects should be given priority in the country now. There were no oil or coal burning in them. "Efforts were being made to generate electricity using solar, water and wind energy. Currently, more than a third of Pakistan's electricity came from projects where no oil or coal was burned. Efforts were being made to generate two-thirds of the electricity in the same decade without burning oil or coal."

=== Electric Vehicles ===
Another eco-friendly project of the government was the promotion of electric vehicles. Smoke from vehicles was a major cause of urban pollution. To address this, the government announced a new policy to promote the use of electric vehicles. Under this policy, duties and taxes on electric vehicles were made nominal. Significant progress was being made in this regard. German car company BMW set up its charging station at Kohsar Market in Islamabad. PSO was also going to build another charging station in Jinnah Supermarket. In Karachi, three charging stations were planned in partnership with Shell and Karachi Electric, which would be installed in Defense, Gulshan and Gadap areas. At present, at least half a dozen companies in the country were installing assembly plants for electric vehicles, which would reduce the cost of these vehicles even more than the current petrol-powered vehicles. The government hoped that by the end of this decade, the share of e-vehicles would reach 30% and 90% by 2030 and 2040 respectively. The first locally produced e-bike was launched along with 6 other models on 8 July 2021.

=== Green diplomacy ===
The Billion Tree Tsunami had not only had a significant environmental impact but had also served as a powerful tool for diplomacy. The initiative's success led to international recognition and cooperation. For instance, Saudi Arabia, after launching its own Billion Tree project, invited Prime Minister Imran Khan to visit and strengthen bilateral relations. Additionally, the United States, recognizing Pakistan's environmental leadership, invited the country to participate in a climate summit.

The global impact of the Billion Tree Tsunami was substantial, with other nations like the UK and New Zealand initiating similar projects. This initiative solidified Pakistan's reputation as an important player in environmental conservation.

== See also ==
- Billion Tree Tsunami, a Khyber Pakhtunkhwa, Pakistan reforestation project
- Trillion Tree Campaign, a UNEP call to plant 1 trillion (1,000,000,000,000 or 10,00,00,00,00,000) trees.
