= Plant-for-the-Planet =

Climate action organization

- Formation: 1 January 2007; 19 years ago
- Type: Initiative & Foundation
- Purpose: Reforestation and advocacy for Climate Justice
- Headquarters: Munich, Germany
- Region served: Worldwide
- Members: 71,000
- Official languages: English, German, Spanish and Portuguese
- Founder: Felix Finkbeiner
- Chair: Fatou Jeng
- Website: plant-for-the-planet.org

Plant-for-the-Planet is an organisation that aims to raise awareness among children and adults about the issues of climate change and global justice. The Initiative also works to plant trees and considers this to be both a practical and symbolic action in efforts to reduce the effect of climate change. Its motto is "Stop Talking, Start Planting". In 2011, it reached a goal of planting a million trees.

The organisation is part of the Partner Circle of the Foundations Platform F20, an international network of foundations and philanthropic organizations.

== Origin ==
The idea for Plant-for-the-Planet was first developed in Germany in 2007 by Felix Finkbeiner, a nine-year-old boy. It was when Finkbeiner's teacher set the assignment to prepare a school report about the issue of climate change, that was first inspired. While conducting his research he came across the story of Wangari Maathai, a Nobel Peace Prize Laureate from Kenya who had worked to plant over 30 million trees across Africa as part of her "Green Belt Movement". At the end of Felix's presentation, he shared the idea that the children of the world could plant 1 million trees in every country on Earth. On 28 March 2007 the first tree was planted at Finkbeiner's school, marking the official launch of Plant-for-the-Planet. Frithjof Finkbeiner, with the Global Marshall Plan Foundation he founded, provided a website and, according to his statements, 1 million flyers to support this campaign in March 2007. On 22 March 2007, a campaign began at the Munich International School in Starnberg-Buchhof, where students packaged these flyers and sent them to 7,000 schools to publicise the UNEP (United Nations Environment Programme) campaign. An online tool on the website was used to manage donations, tree sponsorships, and reports of planting activities. Students in Bavaria and across Germany also got involved and continued to plant trees under the initiative's name. Colin Mummert helped spearhead the Munich campaign for Plant for the Planet. After one year, 150,000 trees had been planted, and in 2008 Finkbeiner was able to reach a larger audience after he was elected to the children's board of the UNEP during the International UNEP Children's Conference in Norway.

On 21 September 2009, Maathai and Felix Finkbeiner met in New York at the invitation of the UNEP for a press conference marking the opening of the International Year of Forests. The eleven-year-old Finkbeiner presented his campaign "Stop talking. Start planting." It was designed to raise awareness of the climate crisis among children and adults alike.

Meanwhile, UNEP Director Achim Steiner announced that the self-imposed goal of planting one billion trees had long been exceeded and that new goals had to be set. The commitment of China, where 2.6 billion trees had been planted by the government, had been decisive in achieving this goal.

On 8 October 2010, the UNEP campaign received the EFFIE in the Social National/International category. The award is presented annually in 15 categories to honour non-profit organisations and initiatives and their effective social marketing communications.

== Development ==
Since its creation in 2007, the organisation has developed into a worldwide movement. In August 2009, Finkbeiner spoke at the UNEP Tunza Children and Youth Conference in Daejeon, South Korea. There he promoted Plant-for-the-Planet and recruited children all around the world to promise to plant 1 million trees in each of their own countries. Plant-for-the-Planet promotes the view that each tree is a contribution towards environmental and climate protection. It also suggests that each tree planting is an action for social justice. The organisation says that it is most often the developing countries that suffer the most from the effects of climate change, despite the fact that they have most often done the least to cause it. Plant-for-the-Planet says it considers each tree to also be a symbol for climate justice. Felix Finkbeiner continued to campaign for environmental protection and tree planting. The Plant-for-the-Planet Foundation was founded in Bavaria in 2011, and in the same year was officially entrusted by the UNEP with the responsibility of continuing the Billion Tree Campaign. By the start of 2011, there were children participating in more than 93 countries. As the organisation has grown, so has its main goal. By 2011, the children had achieved their goal of planting a total of 1 million trees around the world. The organisation also received the tree counter from the UNEP, which, according to media reports, had already registered twelve billion trees at that time. Since entries for more than 10,000 trees could not be verified, leading to false reports of unknown proportions, the foundation now states that it no longer promotes this tree counter and has distanced itself from the figure of "12 billion trees." Founder Felix Finkbeiner was in 2018 awarded the Order of Merit of the Federal Republic of Germany. Educational networking events known as Global Youth Summits are held for Climate Justice Ambassadors and their youth leaders and supporters, most recently in Berlin in 2024. Previous Global Youth Summits have been held at the Evangelishce Akademie, Frankfurt 4–8 October 2023, at Jugendherberge Bonn, in November 2022 and 20–24 November 2019 and online, 16–18 October 2020 and 22–24 October 2021.

Jakob Blasel announced in an interview with Der Spiegel in April 2019 that the financial management of the German branch of the "Fridays for Future" movement (FFFD) is handled by the Plant-for-the-Planet Foundation, which takes care of account management and financial transactions for FFFD. FFFD does not want to set up huge bureaucratic structures. As a result of negative media coverage in December 2020, FFFD removed the name of the organisation from its website and replaced it with "a well-known NGO" that manages the funds. When it took over the temporary trust account service in 2019, Plant-for-the-Planet had already advised FFFD to set up its own non-profit organisation. Plant-for-the-Planet asked FFFD to close the trust account in 2020.

== Structure ==
The organisation's membership is mostly young people, consisting of "members" and "ambassadors"." A member can become an ambassador by attending the Academy, which is a one day conference. As of 2016, members and ambassadors vote online to elect a Global Board, which consists of 14 children (8–14 years old) and 14 youths (15–21 years old). In a second round of voting, two of them are chosen as Global President and Vice-Global President. In addition to the young people, one adult also serves on the board, in a position called the "Planet-for-the-Planet Secretariat". The goal of the Global Board is to give the organisation a focus and make organisation-wide decisions.

== Campaigns and actions ==
In spring 2021, Plant-for-the-Planet launched a Nationwide print campaign in Germany featuring prominent faces from the TV industry, including Willi Weitzel, Inka Schneider, and Hannes Jaenicke.

=== Tree planting ===
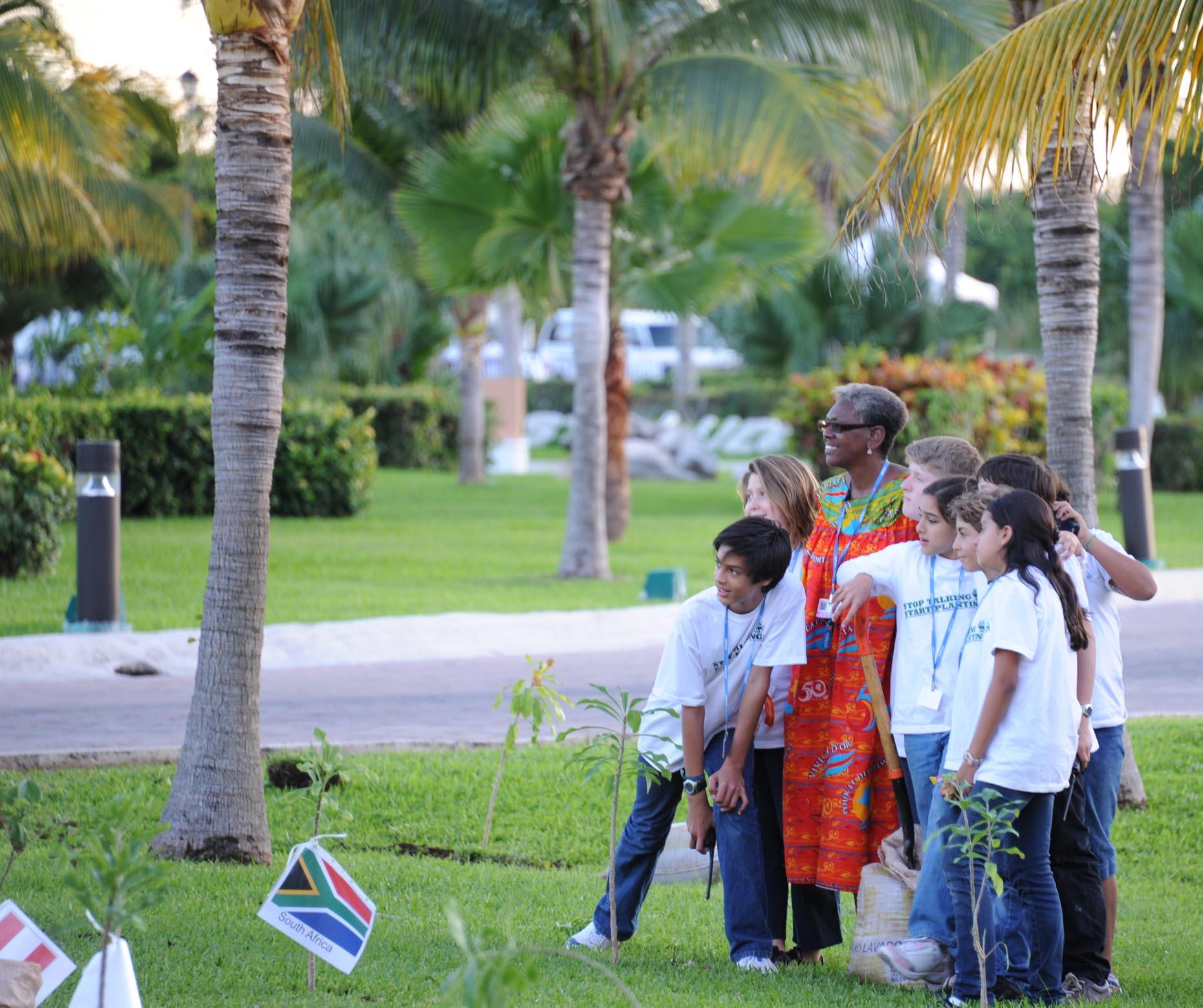
Young "Ambassadors for Climate Justice" after a tree planting event at the Climate Conference in Cancun, Mexico, in 2010

Coordinated with the organisation, tree planting activities or "parties" are organised by students and children themselves. The students need to find foresters and environmental organisations to supply seedlings, and show them how, where, and when to plant. The funding needed to plant trees comes from individual and corporate donations. For restoration in Yucatán Peninsula in Mexico, Plant-for-the-Planet promises to plant one tree for every Euro donated. The reforestation in the foundation's own area on the Yucatán Peninsula is the only renaturation project managed by the foundation itself to date, where 6.3 million trees had been planted by May 2021. The organization also has a system of independent auditors to guarantee that the correct number of trees have been planted.

In 2018, Plant-for-the-Planet created the platform for Trillion Tree Campaign where restoration organizations showcase their projects and receive funding directly from Plant-for-the-Planet supporters. As of 19 June 2021, 32 million trees have been donated and 167 projects participate globally. To help collect on-site data for forest restoration and to enhance transparency in the platform, Plant-for-the-Planet has created TreeMapper, an open source and free tool for restoration organizations.

Outside Mexico, tree planting initiatives were launched by Plant-for-the-Planet and implemented by external tree planters in a number of countries, including Malaysia, the Philippines, Namibia, and Costa Rica. By early 2023, Plant-for-the-Planet had planted more than 15 million trees worldwide.

=== Reforestation project in Mexico ===
For one euro, Plant-for-the-Planet guarantees to plant a tree in its own project on the Yucatán Peninsula in Mexico. According to the organization, the reforestation is certified by auditors and can be viewed by anyone on its website. This project, in conjunction with scientific research, also serves as a blueprint for partner projects registered by Plant-for-the-Planet, such as Plant-for-the-Planet Ghana and Plant-for-the-Planet Ethiopia.

According to the organization, 16.3 million trees were planted on its 20,000 hectares of land between 2015 and 2025.

Since January 2020, a 90-hectare research area has been operated in collaboration with ETH Zurich and Imperial College London.

=== The Change Chocolate ===
The Change Chocolate, also known as "Die Gute Schokolade" in Germany, is a fair trade, carbon-neutral product initiated by the Plant-for-the-Planet movement. The Change Chocolate was created by children who sought support from global chocolate firms for their tree-planting campaign but were turned down. This led them to establish their own brand, now Germany's best-tasting Fairtrade chocolate. The chocolate has also been presented to delegates attending the UN Climate Conferences with a call for urgent action for climate justice. Each sale of five bars results in one tree planted, contributing to over 9 Million trees financed as of October 1, 2023. A dark vegan chocolate variant has also been introduced to cater to a wider demographic.

=== Trillion Tree Campaign ===
After the handover of Billion Tree Campaign by the UNEP, Plant-for-the-Planet increased the goal of the initiative to plant a Trillion Trees. In September 2019, Plant-for-the-Planet released the "Plant-for-the-Planet App" to enable transparency and monitoring to global tree planting efforts. According to the Trillion Tree Campaign website 13.6 Billion trees have been planted as a part of the initiative. In the World Economic Forum 2020 at Davos, the Forum launched an initiative to bring support to plant a Trillion Trees worldwide. Many prominent people have appeared in the "Stop Talking, Start Planting" poster campaign, including politician Mary Robinson, actor Harrison Ford and Albert II, Prince of Monaco.

== Cooperation ==
=== Partners ===
The children of Plant-for-the-Planet do have support from adults: Klaus Töpfer, a former executive director of UNEP and environmental politics expert, is a patron of the organisation. The AVINA Foundation, the Club of Rome and the Global Marshall Plan all offer administrative support to the organisation. Develey, Ernst & Young, Hess Natur and Toyota also provide financial support.

In February 2010, a Plant-for-the-Planet Children's Foundation was established. The function of the foundation is to facilitate cooperation with partners in order to coordinate and support the work and activities of the children. The foundation is also intended to relieve the Global Marshall plan, who were previously acting as secretariat.

=== Collaboration with Crowther Lab ===
In 2013, Plant-for-the-Planet asked Tom Crowther, then a postdoctoral researcher in ecology at Yale University, to conduct a study on the Earth's tree population. The aim was to determine the number of trees already existing on Earth and the potential number that could be planted. On 2 September 2015, Crowther published the study's result in the journal Nature.

The study showed that there were once around six trillion trees on Earth, of which around three trillion remain. According to his estimates, there would still be space for around 1.2 trillion trees. Felix Finkbeiner thus saw the goal of the Trillion Tree Campaign, which he had proclaimed in his UN speech, scientifically confirmed. Plant-for-the-Planet then applied for research funding from the German Federal Ministry for Economic Cooperation and Development (BMZ) in 2016, which was to be used to establish an independent chair headed by Tom Crowther in order to continue the studies that had been started. The BMZ approved the 2016 funding application for a "Global Research Group for Climate Justice" with a three-year term, which led to the founding of the Crowther Lab in 2017. In 2019, Tom Crowther and his team published a follow-up study showing where forests could be restored around the world and what impact this could have on the climate crisis. The study was presented at the Federal Press Conference in the presence of the Federal Minister for Economic Cooperation and Development, Gerd Müller.

=== UN Decade on Ecosystem Restoration ===
Plant-for-the-Planet is a Supporting Partner of the UN Decade on Ecosystem Restoration 2021–2030, launched on 5 June 2021, to raise awareness of environmental issues in society.

== Press Coverage, Criticism and Rebuttal ==
A 2017 National Geographic article provides a comprehensive background to the organisation and its founder, Felix Finkbeiner.

In 2019, Die Zeit published an article questioning the published planting figures and the methods used to determine them. Criticism was raised about the mixing of data on trees planted on Plant for the Planet's initiative with those already planted through UN actions before the project was founded, which was handed over by the UN to Plant-for-the-Planet in 2011. The collection of data on plantings without prior control was also criticized. By now, planting entries are supported by geodata.

In 2020, Die Zeit renewed its criticism. Both the tree plantings reported by Plant for the Planet, and their survival rate, were said to be "unlikely " high. " The chosen location of the tree plantings was also criticized, as further plantings at this location would not seem to make much ecological sense. The transparency of the organization was criticized, whereupon Plant for the Planet published that they will disclose all data, facts and figures transparently in the future.

Felix Finkbeiner explained the criticism on the same day in an open letter as a "complete distortion" that would misrepresent facts and work with assumptions and insinuations.

In 2021, the magazines Zeit and Stern again reported critically. The promises of Plant for the Planet were "too good to be true". The magazines again criticized that the areas selected by the organization were not optimally chosen.

"Its founder, Felix Finkbeiner, claimed that the trees were being planted in Mexico on '22,500 hectares of destroyed rainforest,' but research showed that almost half of the hectares stated were located in a protected biosphere reserve for which the organisation did not even have a planting permit. In addition, a large part of the planting area has long been forested. Another area was underwater for months. The organisation had also given the impression that its plantations were being inspected by the Mexican state forestry authority, which was not the case. It also advertised to its donors that 94 per cent of the seedlings they donated would survive the difficult first year – which was not substantiated (...) Felix Finkbeiner has since admitted that the survival of the plants was not checked at all because they wanted to save money."

Up until 2018 tree planting activities were certified by the Comisión Nacional Forestal (CONAFOR), the sub-authority of the Mexican Ministry of Environment. Due to Conafor-budget cuts regular visits by the authorities were stopped which was criticized by the authors of the Zeit. Yet, the foundation states that visits by authorities, experts and journalists are possible at any time. The accusation is also made that the organizational structure of the Mexican subsidiary association, to which the donations from Germany are transferred, is "not compatible with German laws". The association consisted only of the two founders, father and son Finkbeiner and a Mexican entrepreneur. The foundation has announced that they have convened an independent group of reforestation experts to review and monitor the work in the planting site and that auditors from PKF would examine the financial records.

Some partners decided to temporarily pause the cooperation until the test certificates and expert opinions are available.

Based on previous publications, Stern conducted its own research. The promises made by Plant-for-the-Planet were "too good to be true." Well-founded doubts were raised about the survival rate of the trees and the choice of reforestation areas. It was also alleged that the organisational structure of the Mexican subsidiary to which donations from Germany are transferred was "not compatible with German law." Criticism was levelled at the fact that the foundation consists only of the two founders, father and son Finkbeiner, and a Mexican entrepreneur. There are no committees or supervisory bodies, but there is the possibility of passing on donations to other charitable organisations. According to its own statements, the foundation then convened an independent group of reforestation experts to accompany the work of its own team of scientists in the renaturation area and commissioned, among others, the auditing firm PKF to audit the Mexican annual financial statements and tree accounting.

In August 2021, auditing firm PKF issued a statement that read "The results of the audit did not give rise to any objections, and on 30 July 2021 an unconditional audit opinion was issued on the annual reports of Plant For The Planet, A.C. for the 2015 to 2020 reports." Another auditing firm HSL also provided with unconditional audit opinions on the financial statements of Plant-for-the-Planet Foundation in Germany. International Law firms, White & Case and Gibson Dunn also presented their statements that read Plant-for-the-Planet's statues and structure are in compliance with both the Mexican and German laws respectively.

In an interview with Merkur in November 2021, Felix Finkbeiner stated that the team of ecologists and the communications team had been expanded, an external monitoring committee consisting of three ecology professors from the US, Germany, and Mexico and an economist had been set up, and the statutes were being revised. In August 2022, new statutes were enacted in Germany, which, among other things, stipulated a separation of duties between the foundation's executive board and foundation council.

== Awards ==
2011

- Success for Future Award 2011

2012

- Winspiration Award 2012

2013

- Hamburg Social Oscar 2012 Silver

2016

- German Sustainability Award for "Good Chocolate", category TOP 3 Germany's most sustainable products

2017

- Billion Acts Hero Award, nomination in the Best Youth Act category

2020

- Youth Prize of the International Westphalian Peace Prize, awarded in August 2021 due to the coronavirus pandemic

2024

- United Nations SDG Action Award 2024 in the Impact category

== See also ==
- Billion Tree Campaign
- Global Marshall Plan
- 350.org
- Climate Reality Project
- Climate justice
- Climate crisis
