= Fenaco =

Agricultural cooperative federation based in Bern, Switzerland

- Type: Cooperative Federation
- Industry: Agricultural products, farming supplies, retail, energy
- Founded: 1993
- Headquarters: Bern, Switzerland
- Area served: Switzerland
- Key people: Michael Feitknecht, CEO; Pierre-André Geiser (President of the Board of Directors)
- Revenue: 7.2 billion Swiss francs (2025)
- Operating income: 111 million Swiss francs (2025)
- Net income: 3.6 million Swiss francs (2025)
- Members: 133 cooperatives
- Number of employees: 11,613 (2025)
- Website: fenaco.com

Fenaco is an agricultural cooperative federation in Switzerland, headquartered in Bern. Fenaco is an acronym of its French name fédération nationale des coopératives agricoles. Members of the federation are 133 agricultural cooperatives trading under the name Landi as well as some others. This makes Fenaco indirectly owned by the around 39,000 members of the Landi cooperatives, 23,000 of them being active farmers.

== Activity ==
Fenaco is active in providing products and services to farmers as well as in processing and marketing farmers' products in its retail chains. According to a 2005 article in the Neue Zürcher Zeitung, Fenaco has a "dominant role in many agricultural sectors". In 2009, it was placed on position 172 of the Deloitte list of the world's largest 250 producers of consumer goods, although it operates only in Switzerland.

Enterprises or labels of Fenaco are the beverage company Ramseier Suisse, meat producer Ernst Sutter AG, food producer Frigemo, the retailers Volg (small supermarkets) and Landi, fertiliser retailer Landor, animal feed producer UFA AG, and mineral oil company Agrola. As these names are better known to the general public than Fenaco who owns them, it has also been called "the silent giant". Altogether, Fenaco owns 80 subsidiary companies. Swiss trade union Syna has a "social partnership" (a term for a cooperative relationship between trade unions and employer's associations) with Fenaco.

Fenaco has over 11,600 employees and in 2025 had a sales revenue of 7.2 billion Swiss francs. In 2022, Fenaco was ranked 39th in the list of the largest companies in Switzerland.

Fenaco is the largest company actually owned by Swiss farmers. The original idea was that farmers should be both customers and suppliers of "their" Landi cooperative, i.e. they would buy their means of production as well as sell their products there. Today, however, there are no longer any contractual obligations. Fenaco and its member cooperatives sell production resources (seeds, feed, plant food and others) to farmers for the production of food. In return, Fenaco buys the farmers' products, especially seeds, grains, oilseeds, potatoes, cattle, eggs, corn, vegetables and fruits. Fenaco markets the products and partially processes them through subsidiaries.

The most important areas of activity are:

- Manufacture, import and trade of agricultural goods
- Purchase, storage, processing and marketing of agricultural products
- Trade in grain and oilseeds as well as fuels

Fenaco owns the transport company Traveco. In October 2014, Fenaco took over all shares of Bison, which operates in the IT sector. Fenaco publishes the largest Swiss agricultural magazine, the UFA-Revue. Union-Fruits SA was taken over in 2007 and Steffen-Ris AG in 2008. Both companies were later liquidated, while the names continued as brands as part of the strategic business unit Inoverde (formerly: Fenaco Landesprodukte). Inoverde, in turn, reports to the Division Lebensmittelindustrie (Food Industry Division). At the beginning of 2011, Fenaco took over Biomill AG (small animal feed) from Groupe Minoteries. In 2015, the majority of Solvatec AG, based in Basel, was taken over, which later would be fully integrated into Agrola. Fenaco also operates its own photovoltaic systems. The largest plant, with an electricity production of around 1.2 GWh per year, was put into operation at the Bätterkinden site in 2019. In 2018, the grain trading activities of the Swiss Grana Group were taken over. In 2020, the majority (70%) of Provins was acquired. DiVino AG, which had already merged with Wein AG, VOLG Weinkellereien AG and Caves Garnier AG, merged with the Rutishauser Weinkellerei AG from Scherzingen to form Rutishauser-DiVino AG in 2021. As of April 1, 2022, Fenaco took over Green Pack Swiss and Bio Pack Swiss, thereby strengthening the organic and demeter areas. In addition, the Fenaco subsidiary Serco Landtechnik of Groupe Serco is the exclusive importer of Claas.

== History ==
Switzerland was considered a crop producing country until the 1880s. This changed with Switzerland's construction of the railway. With the help of the new means of transport, cheap grain could be imported. Out of necessity, agricultural cooperatives were founded as self-help organizations for farmers. Fenaco was founded in 1993 as a merger of six existing agricultural cooperative federations with roots in the late 19th century:

- Union des coopératives agricoles romandes UCAR
- Association of agricultural cooperatives of the Canton of Friborg (French Fédération des coopératives agricoles du Canton de Fribourg, FCA), based in Fribourg
- Association of agricultural cooperatives of Bern and neighboring cantons, VLG Bern, based in Bern
- Northwest Association of Agricultural Cooperatives NWV /Association of Agricultural Cooperatives of Northwestern Switzerland (VLGN), based in Solothurn
- Association of Agricultural Cooperatives of Central Switzerland (VLGZ), based in Sursee
- Association of Eastern Swiss agricultural cooperatives (VOLG), based in Winterthur

Willy Gehriger, who was awarded the Agro-Star Suisse in 2013, played a key role in the merger. Gehriger was head of Fenaco from 2002 to 2012. Previously, co-founder Ulrich Schlup was the first chairman of the management board. Martin Keller has held the position since 2012.

In 1995, the Cisag S.A. in Cressier, NE was taken over. In 2001, the first gas station store was opened under the brand name TopShop.

Since 2015, Fenaco has been operating the German-Swiss logistics center LahrLogistics in Lahr in a joint venture with ZG Raiffeisen. In 2018, Lonza stopped producing nitrogen fertilizer at its Visp site. The joint venture between Lonza and Fenaco, known as Agroline AG, was then dissolved. Landor AG was also dissolved and now serves as a private label for fertilizer products. In the same year, in the port of Muttenz, where, among other things, 100 to 200 thousand tons of fertilizer are unloaded each year, a silo system for grain was put into operation, which also served as a mandatory storage facility. In 2023, David Käser, who has been working at Fenaco since 2001, took over management of the Landi division.

Fenaco is a member of the Swiss Farmers' Association and is represented on the board by Fenaco board president Pierre-André Geiser.

== Sales development ==
Fenaco's revenue is in billions of Swiss francs according to the annual reports 2015, 2016, 2021 and 2022, as well as various media reports. When Fenaco was founded in 1993, sales amounted to around 3 billion francs.

== Miscellaneous ==
From 1996 to 2015, Guy Parmelin was a member of the board of directors of Fenaco and vice-president from 2009. Ueli Maurer was also once represented on the board of directors of Fenaco. The management positions at Fenaco mostly occupied by men. There are five women for every 19 men on the board of directors and four women for every 12 men on the executive board (as of May 2026).
