= Feminism in Kenya =

Feminism in Kenya concerns the organized efforts to improve the rights of the girls and women of Kenya. The modern feminist movement, which took off in the early 1960s and also in the 1970s, gained impetus through the establishment of various organisations such as Maendeleo Ya Wanawake (Women’s Progress) and Kenya Women’s Political Caucus (Kenya Women Parliamentary Association).

== History ==
=== Overview ===
The women's empowerment activities in Kenya were influenced by the history of colonization in the nation as well as its cultural practices and political structure. Women used to have substantial social and economic autonomy before colonialism undermined their status. After gaining independence, women like Margaret Wanjiru or Julia Ojiambo advocated for gender equality which they achieved in later years.

=== Women's suffrage and civic engagement ===
In 1963, Kenyan women were given the right to vote, though their political involvement remained restricted. In the world today, women are getting more politically involved, they are vying for various seats and other leadership roles. These organizations fight for the rights of women to participate in politics, for example, Federation of Women Lawyers in Kenya (FIDA-K) and Women Political Caucus.

==== Early struggles ====
In the 1940s and ’50s, Mary Muthoni Nyanjiru and Margaret Wanjiru were among those who championed for women’s rights as well as political participation.

==== 1963's suffrage ====
Kenya granted women the right to vote and run for office, a major milestone.

==== 1970s-1980s: women's political activism ====
Organizations such as the Kenya Women's Political Caucus and the National Council of Women of Kenya (NCWK) emerged, advocating for women's political empowerment.

==== 1990s: multiparty era ====
With the reintroduction of multiparty politics, women such as Charity Ngilu, Wangari Maathai, and Martha Karua ventured into mainstream politics.

==== 2000s: increased representation ====
More women were elected to parliament, including Minister of Justice Martha Karua and Minister of Gender and Children Affairs, Esther Murugi.

==== 2010: constitutional reforms ====
The new constitution reserved 47 special seats for women in the National Assembly and Senate, ensuring a minimum 33% representation.

Some of women's civic engagement and political participation in Kenya include:

- Wangari Maathai: a Nobel Peace Prize laureate and founder of the Green Belt Movement, who ran for president in 1997.
- Martha Karua: a former Minister of Justice and MP, known for her advocacy on gender-based violence and political reform.
- Charity Ngilu: a former Minister of Health and MP, who championed healthcare reform and women's empowerment.
- Susan Kihika: a Senator and former MP, known for her work on gender-based violence and women's rights.
- Passaris: a businesswoman and politician who became the first woman to be elected as the Governor of Nairobi County.

==== 2020: Protests ====
On 10 December 2024, thousands of people, mostly women, marched in the capital city, Nairobi, in protest against a wave of femicides. Some smaller groups also marched in other towns. The main demand was for the government to take action. Despite the protest being peaceful, the police used tear gas to disperse the group in Nairobi.

=== Anti-discrimination laws ===
In Kenya, women are protected from discrimination by the law. These laws include the (2010), for instance, the constitutional provisions found in The Constitution of the Republic of Kenya as well as The Employment Act No 11 of 2007 enacted in (2007). One such law is The Sexual Offences Act No 3 of 2006, which criminalises sexual violence. Again, there is another one called The Marriage Act No 4 of 2014 that prohibits early/child marriages among others. However, executing and enforcing them remains a problem.

=== Marital rape law ===
Activists lobbied against the criminalization of marital rape in Kenya through legislation without success. There is recognition by the courts that marital rape constitutes a kind of violence based on gender; however, protection mechanisms must extend towards victims.

=== Persecution of activists ===
A lot of challenges against feminist campaigners exist in Kenya including online harassment, intimidations as well as attacks. Certain campaigners have been elevated to the status of being ‘divisive’ or ‘anti-cultural’ because they criticise patriarchal norms. Nevertheless, female rights activists in Kenya have remained committed to fighting for justice and equality.

== Challenges ==
=== Patriarchal culture ===
Deep-rooted gender stereotypes and biases perpetuate male dominance and limit women's opportunities.

=== Traditional gender roles ===
Expectations around domestic and reproductive work constrain women's ability to pursue education, careers, and political roles.

=== Violence and harassment ===
Physical, emotional, and sexual violence against women, including female genital mutilation (FGM) and gender-based violence, remain prevalent.

=== Limited access to education and resources ===
Disparities in education, economic empowerment, and access to healthcare hinder women's ability to assert their rights.

=== Political underrepresentation ===
Despite progress, women remain underrepresented in politics and decision-making positions, limiting their influence on policy and legislation.

=== Stereotyping and stigma ===
Feminists are often labeled as "westernized" or "anti-cultural," discouraging women from identifying as feminists.

=== Religious and cultural resistance ===
Some religious and cultural groups resist gender equality, viewing it as a threat to traditional values.

=== Limited support systems ===
Inadequate support for survivors of gender-based violence, lack of childcare services, and limited mental health resources hinder feminist efforts.

=== Internalized misogyny ===
Women internalizing negative messages about their capabilities and worth, perpetuating self-doubt and limiting their potential.

=== Funding and resource constraints ===
Feminist organizations often face financial challenges, limiting their ability to effectively advocate for women's rights.

== Organizations ==
In Kenya, several organizations are supporting the rights and dignity of women rights and dignity. The post-election violence of 2007-2008 saw the Federation of Women Lawyers in Kenya (FIDA) provide legal aid to women and advocate for the enactment of Sexual Offences Act in 2006.

Kenya Women's Political Caucus, established in 1997 lobbied for the inclusion of gender equality in the 2010 Constitution and organized the "Women's March to State House" in 2016 to demand greater political representation.

The National Council of Women of Kenya (NCWK), established in 1964, was responsible for organizing the “Women’s Decade” (1985-1995) to enhance gender equality and proposed the formation of the National Gender and Equality Commission in 2011. Women’s Rights Organizations (WRO), inaugurated in 1993, fought against female genital mutilation (FGM) during the 90s while offering assistance to survivors of gender-based violence after the outbreak of election-related conflict in 2007-2008.

In 1999, the Centre for Rights Education and Awareness (CREAW) launched the "Girls' Empowerment Program" to enhance girls' education, and in 2015 lobbied for the enactment of the Protection Against Domestic Violence Act. Kenya Female Advisory Organization (KEFADO) began the "Girls' Mentorship Program" in 2003 to promote young girls and held the "Women's Economic Empowerment Conference" in 2018.

Gender-Based Violence Recovery Centre (GBVRC), founded in 2001, has provided counseling services to survivors of gender-based violence during the 2007-2008 post-election violence and campaigned for the establishment of the National GBV Helpline in 2016. African Women's Development and Communication Network (FEMNET), established in 1988, has coordinated the "African Women's Decade" (2010-2020) to promote gender equality and advocated for the establishment of the African Union's Gender and Women's Development Department.

Women in Law and Development in Africa (WILDAF), founded in 1990, has campaigned for the ratification of the Protocol on the Rights of Women in Africa and provided legal support to women during the 2007-2008 post-election violence. Kenya Women's National Council (KWNC), established in 1982, coordinated the "Women's March to State House" in 2016 to demand greater political representation and advocated for the establishment of the National Gender and Equality Commission in 2011.

== See also ==
- Women in Kenya
  - Sexual violence in Kenya
- Women's suffrage in Kenya
- African feminism
