= Wangarĩ Maathai =

Kenyan environmental activist (1940–2011)

Wangarĩ Muta Maathai
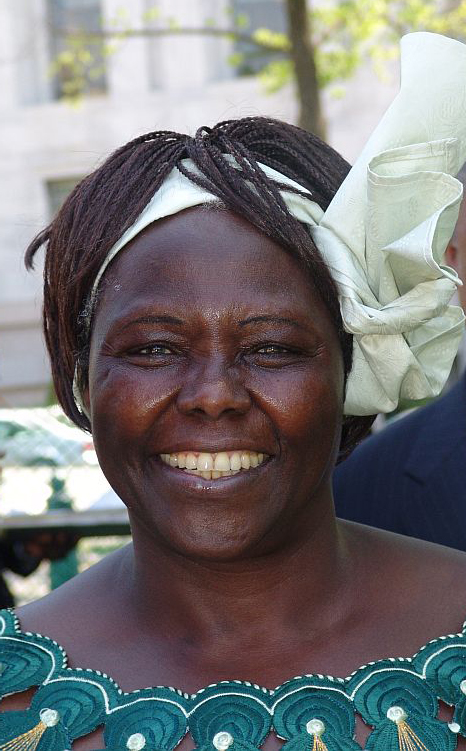
- Maathai in Washington, D.C., in 2005
- Born: Wangarĩ Muta; 1 April 1940; Ihithe, Tetu, Kenya
- Died: 25 September 2011 (aged 71); Nairobi, Kenya
- Education: Benedictine College (BS); University of Pittsburgh (MS); University of Giessen; LMU Munich; University of Nairobi (PhD)
- Occupations: Environmentalist; political; activist; writer
- Known for: Green Belt Movement
- Children: Wanjira Mathai
- Awards: Right Livelihood Award (1984); Nobel Peace Prize (2004); Indira Gandhi Peace Prize (2006)
- Wangarĩ Muta Maathai's voice recorded July 2007

Wangarĩ Maathai (/wænˈɡɑːri mɑːˈðaɪ/; 1 April 1940 – 25 September 2011) was a Kenyan social, environmental, and political activist who founded the Green Belt Movement, an environmental non-governmental organization focused on planting trees, environmental conservation, and women's rights. In 2004, she became the first African woman to win the Nobel Peace Prize.

As a beneficiary of the Kennedy Airlift, she studied in the United States, earning a bachelor's degree from Mount St. Scholastica College in Atchison, Kansas, and a masters degree from the University of Pittsburgh in Pittsburgh. She then became the first woman in East and Central Africa to become a Doctor of Philosophy, receiving her Ph.D. from the University of Nairobi in Nairobi, Kenya. In 1984, she received the Right Livelihood Award for "converting the Kenyan ecological debate into mass action for reforestation."

Wangari Maathai was an elected member of the parliament of Kenya, and served as the assistant minister for environment and natural resources in the government of President Mwai Kibaki between January 2003 and November 2005. She was an Honorary Councillor in the World Future Council. As an academic and the author of several books, Maathai was not only an activist but also an intellectual who made significant contributions to thinking about ecology, development and gender in addition to African cultures and religions. She died of complications from ovarian cancer on 25 September, 2011.

== Early life and education ==
Maathai was born on 1 April,1940 in the village of Ihithe, Nyeri District, in the central highlands of the colony of Kenya. Her family was Kikuyu, the most populous ethnic group in Kenya, and had lived in the area for several generations. Around 1943, Maathai's family moved to a white-owned farm in the Rift Valley near Nakuru, where her father had found work. Late in 1947, she went back to Ihithe with her mother, as two of her brothers were attending primary school in the village, and there was no schooling available on the farm where her father worked. Her father was still at the farm. Shortly afterward, she joined her brothers at Ihithe Primary School at the age of eight.

When she was eleven, Maathai moved to St. Cecilia's Intermediate Primary School, a boarding school at the Mathari Catholic Mission in Nyeri. She studied at St. Cecilia's for four years. During that time, she became fluent in English and converted to Catholicism. She was involved with the Legion of Mary, whose members attempt "to serve God by serving fellow human beings." Studying at St. Cecilia's, she was sheltered from the ongoing Mau Mau uprising, which forced her mother to move from their homestead to an emergency village in Ihithe. When Maathai finished her studies there in 1956, she was rated first in her class and was granted admission to the only Catholic high school for girls in Kenya, Loreto High School in Limuru.

As the end of East African colonialism approached, Kenyan politicians, such as Tom Mboya, were proposing ways to make education in Western nations available to promising students. John F. Kennedy, then a United States Senator, agreed to fund such a program through the Joseph P. Kennedy Jr. Foundation, initiating what became known as the Kennedy Airlift or Airlift Africa. Maathai became one of some 300 Kenyans selected to study in the United States in September 1960.

She received a scholarship to study at Mount St. Scholastica College (now Benedictine College), in Atchison, Kansas, where she majored in biology, with minors in chemistry and German. After receiving a Bachelor of Science degree in 1964, she studied at the University of Pittsburgh for a masters degree in biology. Her graduate studies were funded by the Africa-America Institute, and while she was in Pittsburgh, she first experienced environmental restoration, when local environmentalists pushed to rid the city of air pollution. In January 1966, Maathai received her MSc degree in biological sciences, and was appointed to a position as research assistant to a professor of zoology at the University College of Nairobi in Nairobi.

Maathai dropped her forename, preferring to be known by her birth name, Wangarĩ Muta when she returned to Kenya. When she arrived at the university to start a job, she was informed that it had been given to someone else. She believed this was because of gender and tribal bias. After a two-month job search, Professor Reinhold Hofmann, from the University of Giessen offered her a job as a research assistant in the microanatomy section of the newly established Department of Veterinary Anatomy in the School of Veterinary Medicine at the University College of Nairobi.

In April 1966, Maathai met Mwangi Mathai, another Kenyan who had studied in America, who would later become her husband. She also rented a small shop in the city and established a general store, at which her sisters worked. In 1967, at the urging of Professor Hofmann, she travelled to the University of Giessen in Germany in pursuit of a doctorate. She studied both at the University of Giessen and LMU Munich. In the spring of 1969, she returned to Nairobi to continue her studies at the University College of Nairobi as an assistant lecturer. In May, she and Mwangi Mathai married. Later in the same year, she became pregnant with her first child, and her husband campaigned for a seat in Parliament, narrowly losing. During the election, Tom Mboya, who had been instrumental in founding the program which sent her overseas, was assassinated. This led to President Kenyatta effectually ending multi-party democracy in Kenya. Shortly after, her first son, Waweru, was born. In 1971, she became the first Eastern African woman to receive a Ph.D., her doctorate in veterinary anatomy, from the University College of Nairobi, which became the University of Nairobi the following year. She completed her dissertation on the development and differentiation of gonads in bovines. Her daughter, Wanjira, was born in December 1971.

== Activism and political life ==
=== 1972–1977: Start of activism ===
Maathai continued to teach at the University of Nairobi, becoming a senior lecturer in anatomy in 1975, chair of the Department of Veterinary Anatomy in 1976, and associate professor in 1977. She was the first woman in Nairobi appointed to any of these positions. During this time, she campaigned for equal benefits for the women working on the staff of the university, going so far as trying to turn the academic staff association of the university into a union, to negotiate for benefits. The courts denied this bid, but many of her demands for equal benefits were later met. In addition to her work at the University of Nairobi, Maathai became involved in several civic organisations in the early 1970s. She was a member of the Nairobi branch of the Kenya Red Cross Society, becoming its director in 1973. She was a member of the Kenya Association of University Women. Following the establishment of the Environment Liaison Centre in 1974, Maathai was asked to be a member of the local board, eventually becoming board chair. The Environment Liaison Centre worked to promote the participation of non-governmental organisations in the work of the United Nations Environment Programme (UNEP), whose headquarters was established in Nairobi following the United Nations Conference on the Human Environment held in Stockholm in 1972. Maathai also joined the National Council of Women of Kenya (NCWK). Through her work at these various volunteer associations, it became evident to Maathai that the root of most of Kenya's problems was environmental degradation.

In 1974, Maathai's family expanded to include her third child, son Muta. Her husband campaigned again for a seat in Parliament, hoping to represent the Lang'ata constituency, and won. During his campaign, he had promised to find jobs to limit the rising unemployment in Kenya. These promises led Maathai to connect her ideas of environmental restoration to providing jobs for the unemployed and led to the founding of Envirocare Ltd., a business that involved the planting of trees to conserve the environment, involving ordinary people in the process. This led to the planting of her first tree nursery, collocated with a government tree nursery in Karura Forest. Envirocare ran into multiple problems, primarily dealing with funding, and ultimately failed. However, through conversations concerning Envirocare and her work at the Environment Liaison Centre, UNEP made it possible to send Maathai to the first UN conference on human settlements, known as Habitat I, in June 1976.

In 1977, Maathai spoke to the NCWK concerning her attendance at Habitat I. She proposed further tree planting, which the council supported. On 5 June 1977, marking World Environment Day, the NCWK marched in a procession from Kenyatta International Conference Centre in downtown Nairobi to Kamukunji Park on the outskirts of the city, where they planted seven trees in honour of historical community leaders. This was the first event of the Green Belt Movement. Maathai encouraged the women of Kenya to plant tree nurseries throughout the country, searching nearby forests for seeds to grow trees native to the area. She agreed to pay the women a small stipend for each seedling which was later planted elsewhere.

In her 2010 book, Replenishing the Earth: Spiritual Values for Healing Ourselves and the World, she discussed the impact of the Green Belt Movement, explaining that the group's civic and environmental seminars stressed "the importance of communities taking responsibility for their actions and mobilizing to address their local needs," and adding, "We all need to work hard to make a difference in our neighborhoods, regions, and countries, and in the world as a whole. That means making sure we work hard, collaborate, and make ourselves better agents to change." In this book, she explicitly engages with religious traditions, including the indigenous Kikuyu religion and Christianity, mobilizing them as resources for environmental thinking and activism.

=== 1977–1979: Personal life challenges ===
Maathai and her husband, Mwangi Mathai, separated in 1977. After a lengthy separation, Mwangi filed for divorce in 1979. He was said to have believed that Wangari was "too strong-minded for a woman" and that he was "unable to control her". In addition to naming her as "cruel" in court filings, he publicly accused her of adultery with another Member of Parliament, which in turn was thought to cause his high blood pressure and the judge ruled in Mwangi's favour. Shortly after the trial, in an interview with Viva magazine, Maathai referred to the judge as either incompetent or corrupt. The interview later led the judge to charge Maathai with contempt of court. She was found guilty and sentenced to six months in jail. After three days in Lang'ata Women's Prison in Nairobi, her lawyer formulated a statement that the court found sufficient for her release. Shortly after the divorce, her former husband sent a letter via his lawyer demanding that Maathai drop his surname. She chose to add an extra "a" instead of changing her name.

The divorce was costly and with lawyers' fees and the loss of her husband's income, Maathai found it difficult to provide for herself and their children on her university wages. An opportunity arose to work for the Economic Commission for Africa through the United Nations Development Programme. As this job required extended travel throughout Africa and was based primarily in Lusaka, Zambia, she was unable to bring her children with her. Maathai chose to send them to her ex-husband and take the job. While she visited them regularly, they lived with their father until 1985.

=== 1979–1982: Political problems ===
In 1979, shortly after the divorce, Maathai ran for the position of chairperson of the National Council of Women of Kenya (NCWK), an umbrella organisation consisting of many women's organisations in the country. The newly elected President of Kenya, Daniel arap Moi, tried to limit the amount of influence those of the Kikuyu ethnicity held in the country, including in volunteer civic organisations such as the NCWK. She lost this election by three votes, but was overwhelmingly chosen to be the vice-chairman of the organisation. In 1980, Maathai ran again for chairman of the NCWK. Again she was opposed, she believes, by the government. When it became apparent that Maathai was going to win the election, Maendeleo Ya Wanawake, a member organisation which represented a majority of Kenya's rural women and whose leader was close to Arap Moi, withdrew from the NCWK. Maathai was then elected chairman of the NCWK unopposed. However, Maendeleo Ya Wanawake came to receive a majority of the financial support for women's programs in the country, and NCWK was left virtually bankrupt. Future funding was much more difficult to come by, but the NCWK survived by increasing its focus on the environment and making its presence and work known. Maathai continued to be re-elected to serve as chairman of the organization every year until she retired from the position in 1987.

In 1982, the parliamentary seat representing her home region of Nyeri was open, and Maathai decided to campaign for the seat. As required by law, she resigned from her position with the University of Nairobi to campaign for office. The courts decided that she was ineligible to run for office because she had not re-registered to vote in the last presidential election in 1979. Maathai believed this to be false and illegal, and brought the matter to court. The court was to meet at nine in the morning, and if she received a favorable ruling, was required to present her candidacy papers in Nyeri by three in the afternoon that day. The judge disqualified her from running on a technicality: as before, they claimed she should have re-registered to vote. When she requested her job back, she was denied. As she lived in university housing and was no longer a staff member, she was evicted.

=== Green Belt Movement ===
Maathai founded the Green Belt Movement in 1977, in response to the environmental concerns raised by rural Kenyan women. She moved into a small home she had purchased years before, and focused on the NCWK before becoming employed again. In the course of her work through the NCWK, she had the opportunity to partner with the executive director of the Norwegian Forestry Society, Wilhelm Elsrud. Maathai became the coordinator. Along with the partnership with the Norwegian Forestry Society, the movement had also received "seed money" from the United Nations Voluntary Fund for Women. These funds allowed for the expansion of the movement, for hiring additional employees to oversee the operations, and for continuing to pay a small stipend to the women who planted seedlings throughout the country. It allowed her to refine the operations of the movement, paying a small stipend to the women's husbands and sons who were literate and able to keep accurate records of seedlings planted.

The UN held the third global women's conference in Nairobi. During the conference, Maathai arranged seminars and presentations to describe the work the Green Belt Movement was doing in Kenya. She escorted delegates to see nurseries and plant trees. She met Peggy Snyder, the head of UNIFEM, and Helvi Sipilä, the first woman appointed a UN assistant secretary general. The conference helped to expand funding for the Green Belt Movement and led to the movement's establishing itself outside Kenya. In 1986, with funding from UNEP, the movement expanded throughout Africa and led to the foundation of the Pan-African Green Belt Network. Forty-five representatives from fifteen African countries travelled to Kenya over the next three years to learn how to set up similar programs in their own countries to combat desertification, deforestation, water crises, and rural hunger. The attention the movement received in the media led to Maathai's being honored with numerous awards. The government of Kenya, however, demanded that the Green Belt Movement separate from the NCWK, believing the latter should focus solely on women's issues, not the environment. Therefore, in 1987, Maathai stepped down as chairperson of the NCWK and focused on the newly separate non-governmental organisation.

=== Government intervention ===
In the later half of the 1980s, the Kenyan government came down against Maathai and the Green Belt Movement. The single-party regime opposed many of the movement's positions regarding democratic rights. The government invoked a colonial-era law prohibiting groups of more than nine people from meeting without a government license. In 1988, the Green Belt Movement carried out pro-democracy activities such as registering voters for the election and pressing for constitutional reform and freedom of expression. The government carried out electoral fraud in the elections to maintain power, according to Maathai.

In October 1989, Maathai learned of a plan to construct the 60-storey Kenya Times Media Trust Complex in Uhuru Park. The complex was intended to house the headquarters of KANU, the Kenya Times newspaper, a trading center, offices, an auditorium, galleries, shopping malls, and parking spaces for 2,000 cars. The plan also included a large statue of President Daniel Arap Moi. Maathai wrote many letters in protest to, among others, the Kenya Times, the Office of the President, the Nairobi city commission, the provincial commissioner, the minister for environment and natural resources, the executive directors of UNEP and the Environment Liaison Centre International, the executive director of the United Nations Educational, Scientific and Cultural Organization (UNESCO), the ministry of public works, and the permanent secretary in the department of international security and administration all received letters. She wrote to Sir John Johnson, the British high commissioner in Nairobi, urging him to intervene with Robert Maxwell, a major shareholder in the project, equating the construction of a tower in Uhuru Park to such construction in Hyde Park or Central Park and maintaining that it could not be tolerated.

When I see Uhuru Park and contemplate its meaning, I feel compelled to fight for it so that my grandchildren may share that dream and that joy of freedom as they one day walk there.

— Wangarĩ Muta Maathai – Unbowed, p. 192.

The government refused to respond to her inquiries and protests, instead responding through the media that Maathai was "a crazy woman"; that denying the project in Uhuru Park would take more than a small portion of public parkland; and proclaiming the project as a "fine and magnificent work of architecture" opposed by only the "ignorant few". On 8 November 1989, Parliament expressed outrage at Maathai's actions, complaining of her letters to foreign organisations and calling the Green Belt Movement a bogus organisation and its members "a bunch of divorcees". They suggested that if Maathai was so comfortable writing to Europeans, perhaps she should go live in Europe.

Despite Maathai's protests, as well as popular protest growing throughout the city, the ground was broken at Uhuru Park for construction of the complex on 15 November 1989. Maathai sought an injunction in the Kenya High Court to halt construction, but the case was thrown out on 11 December. In his first public comments upon the project, President Daniel Arap Moi stated that those who opposed the project had "insects in their heads". On 12 December, in Uhuru Park, during a speech celebrating independence from the British, President Moi suggested Maathai be a proper woman in the African tradition and respect men and be quiet. She was forced by the government to vacate her office, and the Green Belt Movement was moved into her home. The government audited the Green Belt Movement in an apparent attempt to shut it down. Despite the government's efforts, her protests and the media coverage the government's response garnered led foreign investors to cancel the project in January 1990.

In January 1992, it came to the attention of Maathai and other pro-democracy activists that a list of people were targeted for assassination and that a government-sponsored coup was possible. Maathai's name was on the list. The pro-democracy group, known as the Forum for the Restoration of Democracy (FORD), presented its information to the media, calling for a general election. Later that day, Maathai received a warning that one of their members had been arrested. Maathai decided to barricade herself in her home. Shortly thereafter, police arrived and surrounded the house. She was besieged for three days before police cut through the bars she had installed on her windows, came in, and arrested her. She and the other pro-democracy activists who had been arrested were charged with spreading malicious rumors, sedition, and treason. After a day and a half in jail, they were brought to a hearing and released on bail. A variety of international organisations and eight senators (including Al Gore and Edward M. Kennedy) put pressure on the Kenyan government to substantiate the charges against the pro-democracy activists or risk damaging relations with the United States. In November 1992, the Kenyan government dropped the charges.

On 28 February 1992, while released on bail, Maathai and others took part in a hunger strike in a corner of Uhuru Park, which they labeled Freedom Corner, to pressure the government to release political prisoners. After four days of hunger strike, on 3 March 1992, the police forcibly removed the protesters. Maathai and three others were knocked unconscious by police and hospitalized. President Daniel arap Moi called her "a mad woman" and "a threat to the order and security of the country". The attack drew international criticism. The U.S. State Department said it was "deeply concerned" by the violence and by the forcible removal of the hunger strikers. When the prisoners were not released, the protesters mostly mothers of those in prison – moved their protest to All Saints Cathedral, the seat of the Anglican Archbishop in Kenya, across from Uhuru Park. The protest there continued, with Maathai contributing frequently, until early 1993 when the prisoners were finally released.

During that time, Maathai was recognized with various awards internationally, but the Kenyan government did not appreciate her work. In 1991,she received the Goldman Environmental Prize in San Francisco and the Hunger Project's Africa Prize for Leadership in London. CNN aired a three-minute segment about the Goldman prize, but when it aired in Kenya, that segment was cut out. In June 1992, during the long protest at Uhuru Park, both Maathai and President arap Moi travelled to Rio de Janeiro for the UN Conference on Environment and Development (Earth Summit). The Kenyan government accused Maathai of inciting women and encouraging them to strip at Freedom Corner, urging that she should not be allowed to speak at the summit. Despite this, Maathai was chosen to be a chief spokesperson at the summit.

=== Push for democracy ===
During the first multi-party election of Kenya, in 1992, Maathai strove to unite the opposition and for fair elections in Kenya. The Forum for the Restoration of Democracy (FORD) had fractured into FORD-Kenya (led by Oginga Odinga) and FORD-Asili (led by Kenneth Matiba); former vice president Mwai Kibaki had left the ruling Kenya African National Union (KANU) party, and formed the Democratic Party. Maathai and many others believed such a fractured opposition would lead to KANU's retaining control of the country, so they formed the Middle Ground Group in an effort to unite the opposition. Maathai was chosen to serve as its chairperson. Also during the election, Maathai and like-minded opposition members formed the Movement for Free and Fair Elections. Despite their efforts, the opposition did not unite, and the ruling KANU party used intimidation and state-held media to win the election, retaining control of parliament.

It is often difficult to describe to those who live in a free society what life is like in an authoritarian regime. You don't know who to trust. You worry that you, your family, or your friends will be arrested and jailed without due process. The fear of political violence or death, whether through direct assassinations or targeted "accidents", is constant. Such was the case in Kenya, especially during the 1990s.

— Wangarĩ Muta Maathai – Unbowed, p. 206.

The next year, ethnic clashes occurred throughout Kenya. Maathai believed they were incited by the government, who had warned of stark consequences to multi-party democracy. Maathai travelled with friends and the press to areas of violence in order to encourage them to cease fighting. With the Green Belt Movement she planted "trees of peace", but before long her actions were opposed by the government. The conflict areas were labeled as "no go zones", and in February 1993,the president claimed that Maathai had master-minded a distribution of leaflets inciting Kikuyus to attack Kalenjins. After her friend and supporter Dr. Makanga was kidnapped, Maathai chose to go into hiding. While in hiding, Maathai was invited to a meeting in Tokyo of the Green Cross International, an environmental organisation recently founded by former Soviet leader Mikhail Gorbachev. When Maathai responded that she could not attend as she did not believe the government would allow her to leave the country and she was in hiding, Gorbachev pressured the government of Kenya to allow her to travel freely. President arap Moi denied limiting her travel, and she was allowed to leave the country, although too late for the meeting in Tokyo. Maathai was again recognized internationally, and she flew to Scotland to receive the Edinburgh Medal in April 1993. In May,she went to Chicago to receive the Jane Addams International Women's Leadership Award, and in June she attended the UN's World Conference on Human Rights in Vienna.

During the elections of 1997, Maathai again wished to unite the opposition in order to defeat the ruling party. In November, less than two months before the election, she decided to run for parliament and for president as a candidate of the Liberal Party. Her intentions were widely questioned in the press; many believed she should simply stick to running the Green Belt Movement and stay out of politics. On the day of the election, a rumour that Maathai had withdrawn from the election and endorsed another candidate was printed in the media. Maathai garnered few votes and lost the election.

In the summer of 1998, Maathai learned of a government plan to privatize large areas of public land in the Karura Forest, just outside Nairobi, and give it to political supporters. Maathai protested this through letters to the government and the press. She went with the Green Belt Movement to Karura Forest, planting trees and protesting the destruction of the forest. On 8 January 1999, a group of protesters including Maathai, six opposition MPs, journalists, international observers, and Green Belt members and supporters returned to the forest to plant a tree in protest. The entry to the forest was guarded by a large group of men. When she tried to plant a tree in an area that had been designated to be cleared for a golf course, the group was attacked. Many of the protesters were injured, including Maathai, four MPs, some of the journalists, and German environmentalists. When she reported the attack to the police, they refused to return with her to the forest to arrest her attackers. However, the attack had been filmed by Maathai's supporters, and the event provoked international outrage. Student protests broke out throughout Nairobi, and some of these groups were violently broken up by the police. Protests continued until 16 August 1999, when the president announced that he was banning all allocation of public land.

In 2001, the government again planned to take public forest land and give it to its supporters. While protesting this and collecting petition signatures on 7 March 2001, in Wang'uru village near Mount Kenya, Maathai again was arrested. The following day, following international and popular protest at her arrest, she was released without being charged. On 7 July 2001, shortly after planting trees at Freedom Corner in Uhuru Park in Nairobi to commemorate Saba Saba Day, Maathai was again arrested. Later that evening, she was again released without being charged. In January 2002, Maathai returned to teaching as the Dorothy McCluskey Visiting Fellow for Conservation at the Yale University's School of Forestry and Environmental Studies. She remained there until June 2002, teaching a course on sustainable development focused on the work of the Green Belt Movement.

=== Election to parliament ===
Maathai speaks about deforestation at the World Social Forum, January 2007.

After returning to Kenya, Maathai again campaigned for parliament in the 2002 elections, this time as a candidate of the National Rainbow Coalition, the umbrella organisation which finally united the opposition. On 27 December 2002, the Rainbow Coalition defeated the ruling party Kenya African National Union, and in Tetu Constituency Maathai won with an overwhelming 98% of the vote. In January 2003, she was appointed the assistant minister in the Ministry for Environment and Natural Resources and served in the capacity until November 2005. She founded the Mazingira Green Party of Kenya in 2003 to allow candidates to run on a platform of conservation as embodied by the Green Belt Movement. It is a member of the Federation of Green Parties of Africa and the Global Greens.

== 2004 Nobel Peace Prize ==
Wangarĩ Maathai was awarded the 2004 Nobel Peace Prize for her "contribution to sustainable development, democracy and peace." Maathai was the first African woman to win the prestigious award. According to Nobel's will, the Peace Prize shall be awarded to the person who in the preceding year "shall have done the most or the best work for fraternity between nations, for the abolition or reduction of standing armies and for the holding and promotion of peace congresses". Between 1901 and 2018, only 52 Nobel Prize awards were given to women, while 852 Nobel Prize awards have been given to men. Through her significant efforts, Wangari Maathai became the first African woman, and the first environmentalist, to win the Peace Prize.

Maathai stood up courageously against the former oppressive regime in Kenya. Her unique forms of action have contributed to drawing attention to political oppression—nationally and internationally. She has served as inspiration for many in the fight for democratic rights and has especially encouraged women to better their situation.

— The Norwegian Nobel Committee, in a statement announcing her as the 2004 Nobel Peace Prize winner.

== AIDS conspiracy theory ==
Controversy arose when the Kenyan newspaper The Standard reported that Maathai had claimed HIV/AIDS was "deliberately created by Western scientists to decimate the African population." Maathai denied making the allegations, but The Standard has stood by its reports.

In a 2004 interview with Time magazine, in response to questions concerning that report, Maathai replied: "I have no idea who created AIDS and whether it is a biological agent or not. But I do know things like that don't come from the moon. I have always thought that it is important to tell people the truth, but I guess there is some truth that must not be too exposed," and when asked what she meant, she continued, "I'm referring to AIDS. I am sure people know where it came from. And I'm quite sure it did not come from the monkeys." In response she issued the following statement:

I have warned people against false beliefs and misinformation such as attributing this disease to a curse from God or believing that sleeping with a virgin cures the infection. These prevalent beliefs in my region have led to an upsurge in rape and violence against children. It is within this context, also complicated by the cultural and religious perspective, that I often speak. I have therefore been shocked by the ongoing debate generated by what I am purported to have said. It is therefore critical for me to state that I neither say nor believe that the virus was developed by white people or white powers in order to destroy the African people. Such views are wicked and destructive.

== 2005–2011: Later life ==
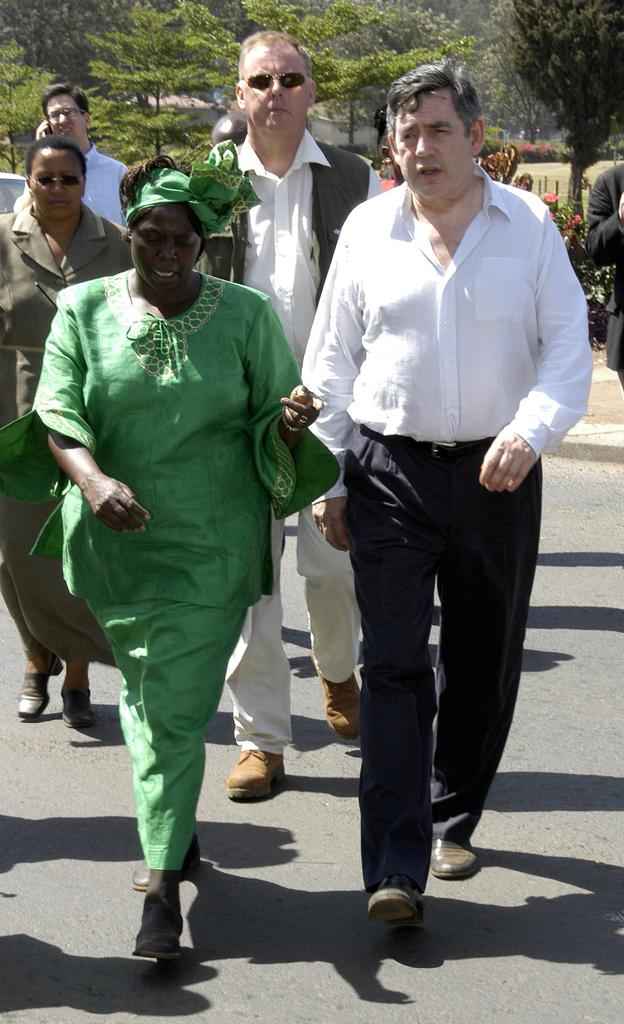
Maathai in Nairobi with Chancellor of the Exchequer (and later the prime minister) Gordon Brown touring a primary school, January 2005

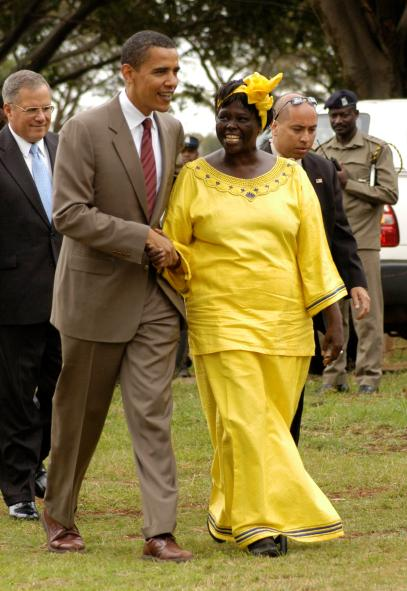
Maathai and then U.S. Senator Barack Obama in Nairobi, August 2006

After a trip to Japan in 2005, Maathai became an enthusiastic proponent of the waste-reduction philosophy of mottainai, a Japanese term of Buddhist origin. On 28 March 2005, she was elected the first president of the African Union's Economic, Social and Cultural Council and was appointed a goodwill ambassador for an initiative aimed at protecting the Congo Basin Forest Ecosystem. In 2006, she was one of the eight flag-bearers at the 2006 Winter Olympics Opening Ceremony. Also on 21 May 2006, she was awarded an honorary doctorate by and gave the commencement address at Connecticut College. She supported the International Year of Deserts and Desertification program. In November 2006, she spearheaded the United Nations Billion Tree Campaign. Maathai was one of the founders of the Nobel Women's Initiative along with sister Nobel Peace laureates Jody Williams, Shirin Ebadi, Rigoberta Menchú Tum, Betty Williams and Mairead Corrigan Maguire. Six women representing North America and South America, Europe, the Middle East and Africa decided to bring together their experiences in a united effort for peace with justice and equality. It is the goal of the Nobel Women's Initiative to help strengthen work being done in support of women's rights around the world.

In August 2006, then United States Senator Barack Obama traveled to Kenya. His father was educated in America through the same program as Maathai. She and the Senator met and planted a tree together in Uhuru Park in Nairobi. Obama called for freedom of the press to be respected, saying, "Press freedom is like tending a garden; it continually has to be nurtured and cultivated. The citizenry has to value it because it's one of those things that can slip away if we're not vigilant." He deplored global ecological losses, singling out President George W. Bush's refusal to join the United Nations Framework Convention on Climate Change (UNFCCC) and its subsidiary, the Kyoto Protocol.

Maathai was defeated in the Party of National Unity's primary elections for its parliamentary candidates in November 2007 and chose to instead run as the candidate of a smaller party. She was defeated in the December 2007 parliamentary election. She called for a recount of votes in the presidential election (officially won by Mwai Kibaki, but disputed by the opposition) in her constituency, saying that both sides should feel the outcome was fair and that there were indications of fraud.

In 2009, she published "The Challenge for Africa" with her insights into the strengths and weaknesses of governance in Africa, her own experiences, and the centrality of environmental protection to Africa's future.

In June 2009, Maathai was named as one of PeaceByPeace.com's first peace heroes. Until her death in 2011, Maathai served on the Eminent Advisory Board of the Association of European Parliamentarians with Africa (AWEPA).

Wangarĩ Maathai died on 25 September 2011 of complications arising from ovarian cancer while receiving treatment at a Nairobi hospital.

Her remains were cremated and buried at the Wangari Maathai Institute for Peace and Environmental Studies in Nairobi.

== Wangarĩ Maathai Forest Champion Award ==
In 2012, the Collaborative Partnership on Forests CPF, an international consortium of 14 organisations, secretariats and institutions working on international forest issues, launched the inaugural Wangarĩ Maathai Forest Champion Award.

Winners include:

- 2012 – Narayan Kaji Shrestha, with an honourable mention to Kurshida Begum
- 2014 – Martha Isabel "Pati" Ruiz Corzo, with an honourable mention to Chut Wutty
- 2015 – Gertrude Kabusimbi Kenyangi
- 2017 – Maria Margarida Ribeiro da Silva, a Brazilian forestry activist
- 2019 – Léonidas Nzigiyimpa, a Burundian forestry activist
- 2022 – Cécile Ndjebet, a Cameroonian activist

== Posthumous recognition ==
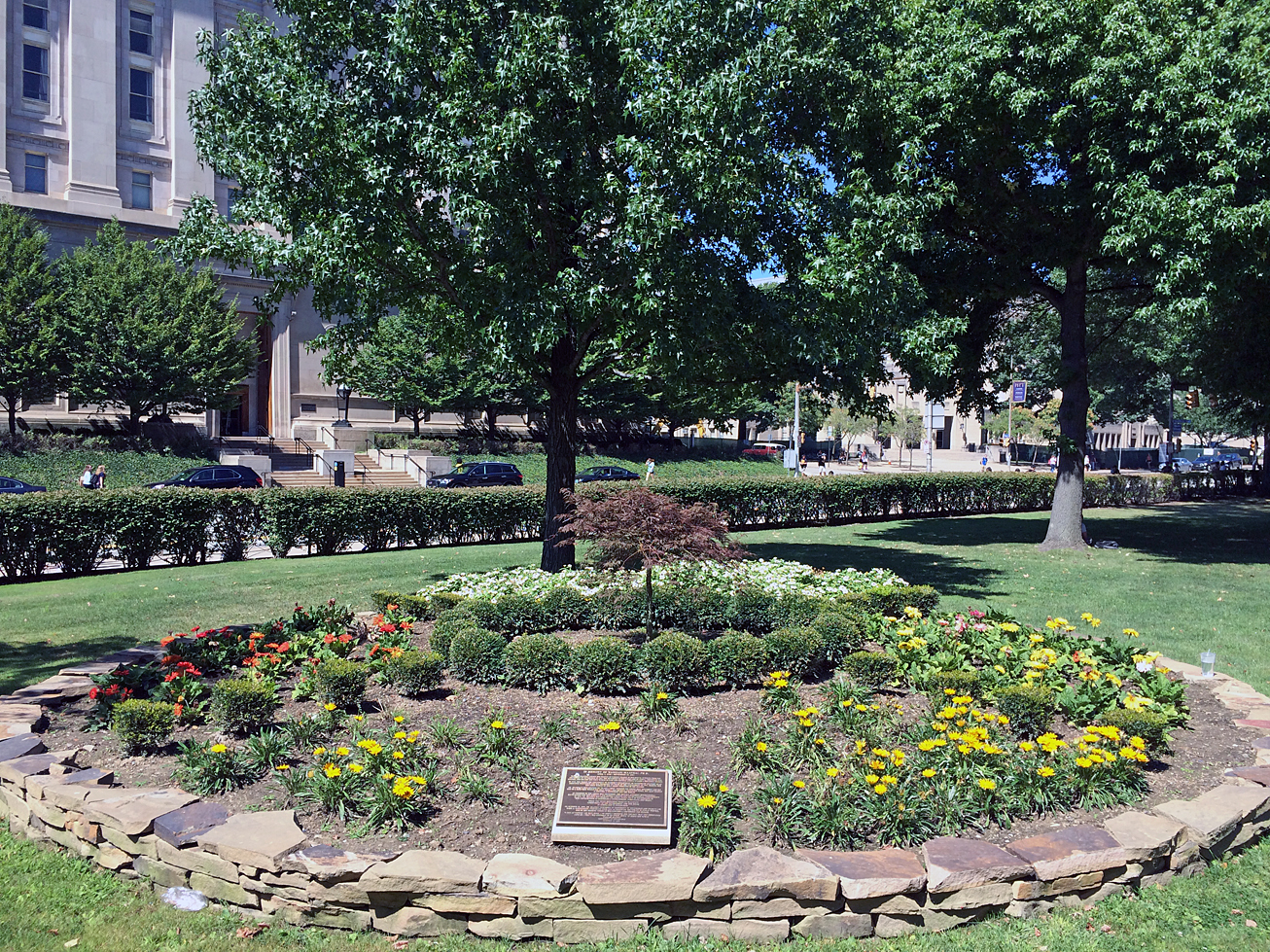
Wangarĩ Maathai memorial trees and garden at the University of Pittsburgh in Pittsburgh

In 2012, Wangarĩ Gardens opened in Washington, D.C. Wangarĩ Gardens is a community garden for local residents which consists of over 55 garden allotments; it is 2.7 acres. The garden honours the legacy of Wangarĩ Maathai and her mission for community engagement and environmental protection. The Wangarĩ Gardens consists of a community garden, youth garden, outdoor classroom, pollinator hive and public fruit tree orchard, vegetable garden, herb garden, berry garden, and a strawberry patch. Within the garden complex there are personal garden plots and public gardens. The personal plots are available to residents living within 1.5 miles of the community garden. Personal plot holders are required to contribute 1 hour monthly to the maintenance of the public gardens. The gardens and orchard are maintained by plot holders and volunteers, and are open to everyone to enjoy and harvest. The Wangarĩ Gardens has no direct affiliation with the Green Belt Movement or the Wangarĩ Maathai Foundation but was inspired by Wangarĩ Maathai and her work and passion for the environment.

On 25 September 2013, the Wangarĩ Maathai Trees and Garden was dedicated on the lawn of the University of Pittsburgh's Cathedral of Learning. The memorial includes two red maples symbolizing Maathai's "commitment to the environment, her founding of the Green Belt Movement, and her roots in Kenya and in Pittsburgh" and a flower garden planted in a circular shape that representing her "global vision and dedication to the women and children of the world" with an ornamental maple tree in the middle signifying "how one small seed can change the world".

In 2014, at what would have been her 50-year class reunion, her Mount St. Scholastica classmates and Benedictine College unveiled a statue of the Nobel laureate at her alma mater's Atchison, Kansas campus. In 2019, with the renovation of the Westerman Hall of Science and Engineering, the college added a mural of Maathai and other scientists to the front entryway of the building.

In 2015, UNESCO published the graphic novel Wangari Maathai and the Green Belt Movement as part of their UNESCO Series on Women in African History. As an artistic and visual interpretation intended for private or public use in classrooms, it tells the story of Maathai and the movement she began.

In October 2016, Forest Road in Nairobi was renamed to Wangarĩ Maathai Road for her efforts to oppose several attempts to degrade forests and public parks through the Green Belt Movement.

In 2019, Time created 89 new covers to celebrate women of the year starting from 1920; it chose Maathai for 2001.

In September 2022, Science Naturally, a Washington, D.C.–based educational publisher, included Dr. Maathai in their Women in Botany book in the Science Wide Open series for children. It says:

"Dr. Wangari started the Green Belt Movement to change things. She taught women in Kenya how to grow trees from seeds, and the women were paid to plant trees all around the country."

== Selected publications ==
- The Green Belt Movement: Sharing the Approach and the Experience. Lantern Books. 2004. ISBN 978-1590560402.; (1985)
- The bottom is heavy too: even with the Green Belt Movement : the Fifth Edinburgh Medal Address (1994)
- Bottle-necks of development in Africa (1995)
- The Canopy of Hope: My Life Campaigning for Africa, Women, and the Environment (2002)
- Unbowed: A Memoir (2006) ISBN 978-0307492333
- Reclaiming rights and resources women, poverty and environment (2007)
- Rainwater Harvesting (2008)
- State of the world's minorities 2008: events of 2007 (2008)
- The Challenge for Africa. Anchor Books. 2010. ISBN 978-0307390288.; (2009)
- Moral Ground: Ethical Action for a Planet in Peril. (2010) chapter Nelson, Michael P. and Kathleen Dean Moore (eds.). Trinity University Press, ISBN 978-1595340665
- Replenishing the Earth (2010) ISBN 978-0307591142

== Honours ==
- 1984: Right Livelihood Award
- 1986: Better World Society
- 1987: Global 500 Roll of Honour
- 1991: Goldman Environmental Prize
- 1991: The Hunger Project's Africa Prize for Leadership
- 1993: Edinburgh Medal (for "Outstanding contribution to Humanity through Science")
- 1993: Jane Addams Leadership Award
- 1993: Benedictine College Offeramus Medal
- 1994: The Golden Ark Award
- 2001: The Juliet Hollister Award
- 2003: Global Environment Award, World Association of Non-Governmental Organizations
- 2004: Conservation Scientist Award from Columbia University
- 2004: J. Sterling Morton Award
- 2004: Petra Kelly Prize
- 2004: Sophie Prize
- 2004: Nobel Peace Prize
- 2006: Légion d'honneur
- 2006: Doctor of Public Service (honorary degree), University of Pittsburgh
- 2007: World Citizenship Award
- 2007: Livingstone Medal from Royal Scottish Geographical Society
- 2007: Indira Gandhi Prize
- 2007: Cross of the Order of St. Benedict
- 2008: The Elizabeth Blackwell Award from Hobart and William Smith Colleges
- 2009: NAACP Image Award - Chairman's Award (with Al Gore)
- 2009: Grand Cordon of the Order of the Rising Sun of Japan
- 2011: The Nichols-Chancellor's Medal awarded by Vanderbilt University
- 2013: Doctor of Science (honorary degree), Syracuse University, New York
- 2020: The Perfect World Award by The Perfect World Foundation

== See also ==
- Black Nobel Prize laureates
- List of female Nobel laureates
- List of peace activists
- Mottainai
- Tokyo International Conference on African Development (TICAD-IV), 2008.
- Women's Environment & Development Organization
