= Wanjira Mathai =

Kenyan environmentalist (born 1971)

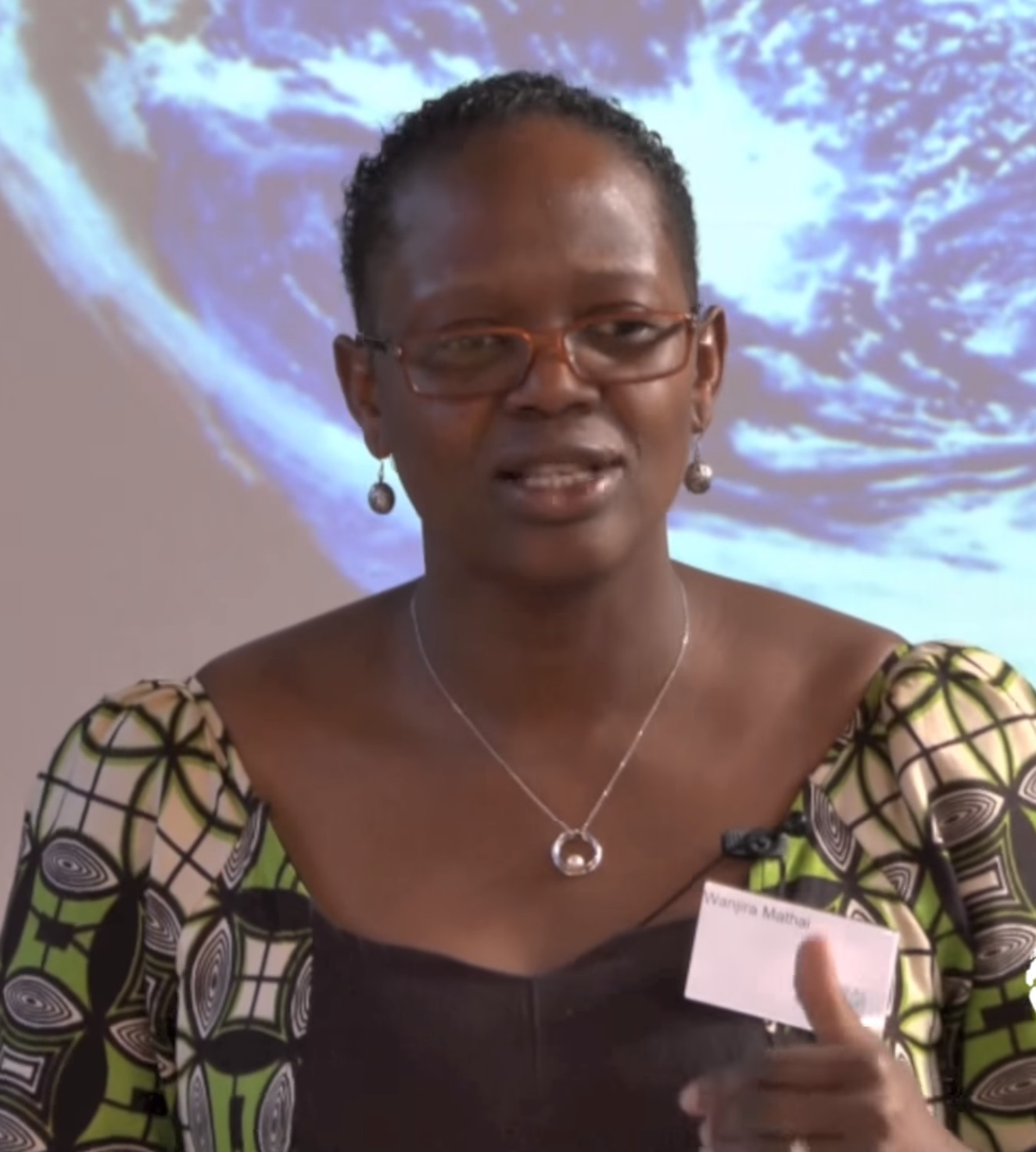
- Mathai speaks at the Global Scholars Symposium in 2013
- Born: 1971 (age 54–55); Kenya
- Education: Hobart & William Smith; Emory University
- Employer(s): Carter Center; World Resources Institute; Green Belt Movement
- Mother: Wangari Maathai

Wanjira Mathai (born December 1971) is a Kenyan environmentalist and activist. She is Managing Director for Africa and Global Partnerships at the World Resources Institute, based in Nairobi, Kenya. In this role, she takes on global issues including deforestation and energy access. She was selected as one of the 100 Most Influential Africans by New African magazine in 2018 for her role serving as the senior advisor at the World Resources Institute, as well as for her campaign to plant more than 30 million trees through her work at the Green Belt Movement.

== Early life and education ==
Mathai was born and raised in Kenya. Her mother, Wangari Maathai, was a social, environmental and political activist and the first African woman to win the Nobel Peace Prize, in 2004.

Mathai was a student at State House Girls' High School in Nairobi. After completing high school, she moved to Geneva, New York, to attend Hobart and William Smith Colleges, where she majored in biology and graduated in 1994. She received a master's degree in Public Health and in Business Administration from Emory University. After graduating, Mathai joined the Carter Center, where she worked on disease control. Here she learned about diseases that impacted African communities, such as dracunculiasis, onchocerciasis and lymphatic filariasis.

== Research and career ==
=== The Green Belt Movement ===
Mathai serves on the World Future Council and on the board of the Green Belt Movement (GBM), which was founded by Wanjira's mother Wangari in 1977. Originally, Mathai served as Director of International of Affairs of the GBM from 2002, and later was made Executive Director of the organization. At this organization, she led fundraising programmes and monitored resource mobilization, as well as facilitated international outreach. She realized that women were more responsive when the GBM called for people to help planting trees. Mathai has said that her work in planting trees, also called agroforestry, was inspired by her mother's environmental work. After her mother won the Nobel Peace Prize in 2004, Mathai accompanied her on a world tour. When her mother died in 2011, Mathai helped steer the club through a time of transition.

=== Other organizations and foundations ===
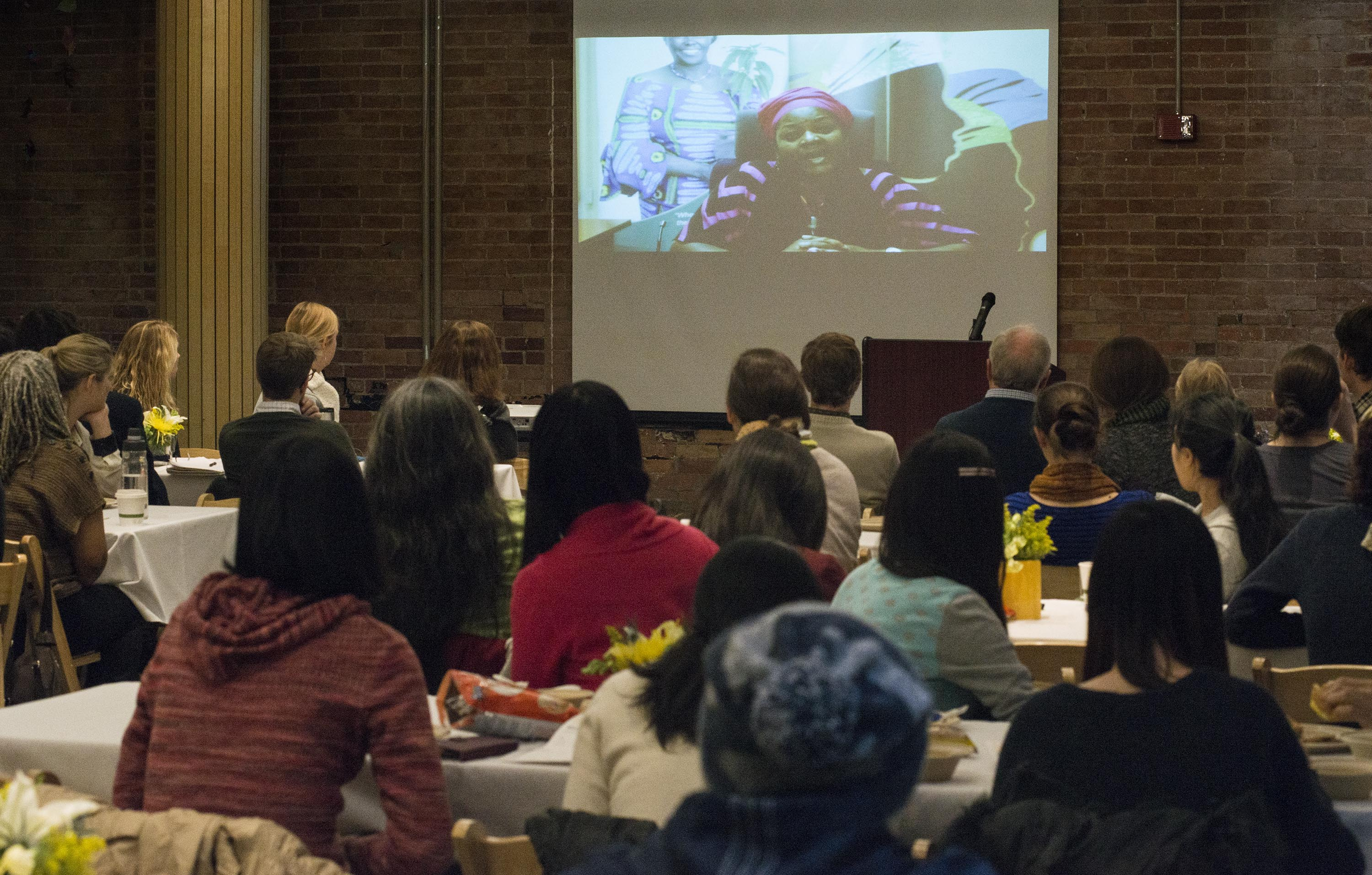
Mathai talking as Director of the Wangari Maathai Institute

Mathai serves as senior advisor of the Partnerships for Women Entrepreneurs in Renewables, which promotes women in renewable energy leadership in an effort to bring renewables to almost four million women in East Africa. To Mathai, women's engagement with renewable energy is one of economic empowerment, fulfilling several of the Sustainable Development Goals. Despite the modernization occurring in Kenya, women still spend several hours a day collecting firewood, and half of all deaths in children under five years old occur due to household air pollution. Mathai serves on the advisory board of the Clean Cooking Alliance, and is also a member of the Earth Chapter International Council. She also serves on the board of trustees of the Center for International Forestry Research (CIFOR). She is also one of a few six second EQ practitioners. These practitioners seek to promote emotional intelligence and support others to create a culture of positivity.

Since 2016, Mathai has served as chairperson of the Wangari Maathai Foundation. The foundation looks to advance the legacy of Wangari Maathai by promoting a culture of purpose with young people serving as leaders. When asked of her work with the foundation, Mathai responded: "I am not living in my mother's shadow, I am basking in her light...". The foundation has three priorities: maintaining Wangari Muta Maathai House, instilling leadership skills in youth to promote creativity and courage at a young age (Wanakesho), and a fellowship for young people. As an illustration of her faith in the importance of educating youth, she was the project director for the Wangari Maathai Institute for Peace and Environmental Studies at the University of Nairobi (WMI). This institute focuses on promoting positive ethics and sustainable development. Educating youth has always been one of Maathai's goals, and she states: "Human beings are not born corrupt. At some point these behaviors are fostered by a culture that promotes individual gain over collective progress." She believes that educating youth will allow for peace-building and for a decrease in corruption in Kenya, as youth will grow up to become future leaders. She often speaks to these topics, as she is a motivational speaker on the topics of youth leadership, environment, and climate change.

In addition, Mathai sits on the board of The World Agroforestry Centre (ICRAF) in Kenya. In 2018 Mathai was selected as one of the 100 Most Influential Africans by New African magazine, as well as the Top Influential African Women by the African Leadership University.

As of December 2019, Mathai has served as Vice President and Regional Director for Africa at World Resources Institute. In this capacity, Mathai convinced the Kenyan Environment Minister Judi Wakhungu to commit to restoring 12.6 million acres of deforested land in Kenya by 2030, building on her mother's environmental activism legacy. This is part of the African Forest Landscape Restoration Initiative (AFR100), which Mathai oversees, an initiative to restore more than 100 million hectares of deforested land in Africa by 2030.

== Awards ==
In April 2023, TIME magazine named Wanjira as one of the top 100 most influential people of 2023.

In November 2023, she was named to the BBC's 100 Women list as one of the world's inspiring and influential women.
