= Kathleen Dean Moore =

American philosopher, writer, and environmental activist

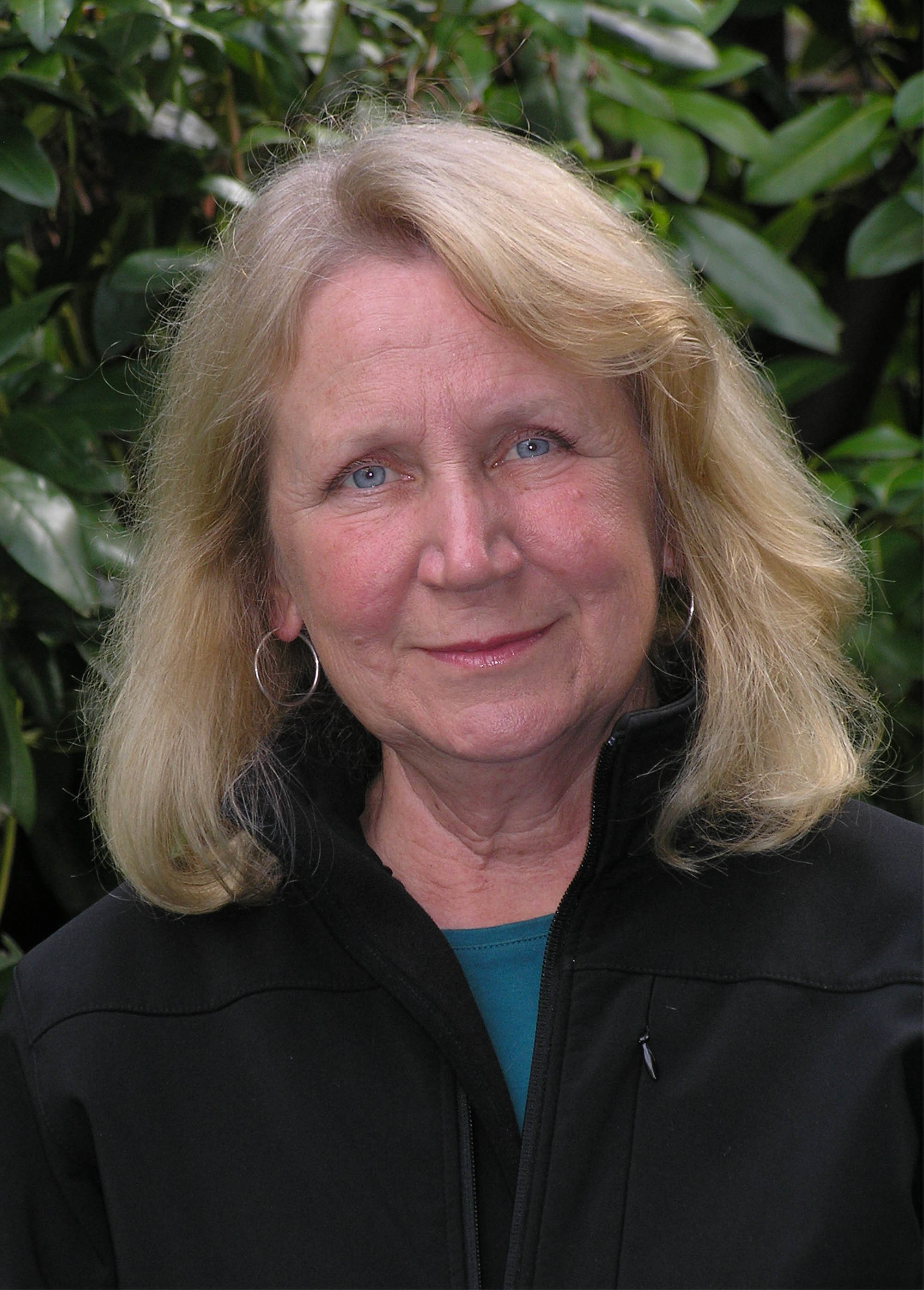
Kathleen Dean Moore in 2010

Kathleen Dean Moore (born 1947, Berea, Ohio) is a philosopher, writer, and environmental activist from Oregon State University. Her early creative nonfiction writing focused on the cultural and spiritual values of the natural world, especially shorelines and islands. Her more recent work is about the moral issues of climate change.

== Early life and education ==
Moore was raised in Berea, Ohio, a suburb of Cleveland. In 1969, she graduated with a B.A. in philosophy and French from Wooster College in Wooster, Ohio. From the University of Colorado Boulder, she earned her M.A. and Ph.D. in philosophy and studied in the Fleming School of Law.

== Career ==
In 1992, Moore joined the faculty of the Department of Philosophy at Oregon State University, where she taught philosophy of law, critical thinking, and environmental philosophy. There, she served as department chair, Master Teacher, and Distinguished Professor, developing field courses such as the Philosophy of Nature, which she taught in the Pacific Cascades. During that time, Moore co-founded, with poet and philanthropist Franz Dolp, the Spring Creek Project for Ideas, Nature, and the Written Word, which she directed for 10 years. As director, she co-founded an ancillary program, the Long-Term Ecological Reflections Project at the H.J. Andrews Forest, in the Oregon Cascades. Long interested in interdisciplinary environmental education, Moore designed Oregon State's Master of Arts in Environmental Arts and Humanities. Moore left the university in 2013 to focus full-time on writing and speaking about climate change.

Moore's first books were academic. Pardons: Justice, Mercy, and the Public Interest began with her dissertation work and continued through a sabbatical leave spent in the Harvard Law Library. From a framework of retributive justice, she asks what justifies the pardoning power, what determines who should be pardoned, and what constitutes an unforgivable crime. She wrote two textbooks, Reasoning and Writing and Patterns of Inductive Reasoning, based on her experience as a teacher of critical thinking. Thereafter, her interest in nature writing and the natural world soon led her to the nature essay, and her next four books were collections of essays about the cultural and spiritual meaning of wild places at the edge of water: Riverwalking, Holdfast, Pine Island Paradox, and Wild Comfort. She co-edited the papers of her late friend and colleague, Viola Cordova, a Jicarilla-Apache philosopher (How It Is) and co-edited a number of other anthologies, including one about Rachel Carson.

In 2011, Moore and her colleague Michael P. Nelson published Moral Ground: Ethical Action for a Planet in Peril, which gathered the testimony of dozens of the world's moral leaders about our obligation to future generations. This was the first of many of Moore's articles, blogs, op-eds, and public talks in which she criticizes fossil fuel extraction and other acts, arguing they may lead to global extinction. Her most recent climate ethics book is Great Tide Rising: Toward Clarity and Moral Courage in a Time of Planetary Change. Moore now travels and speaks about climate action. Her forthcoming book, Piano Tide, is her first novel, telling the story of an Alaskan tidewater town's defense of their freshwater. Her most recent work is a collaboration with the concert pianist, Rachelle McCabe, to bring music to her messages about global extinction Moore has served on the board of directors of the Orion Society and the Island Institute in Sitka, Alaska.

== Personal life ==
Moore lives in Corvallis, Oregon and, in the summers, writes in the southeast Alaska islands. Her husband, Frank, is a biologist, and their children are environmentalists and professors – Erin E. Moore, School of Arts and Architecture, University of Oregon, and Jonathan W. Moore, Liber Eros Chair of Coastal Studies, Simon Fraser University in British Columbia.

== Awards ==
- Honorary Doctorate, State University of New York - FES. 2015
- Senior Fellow, Spring Creek Project for Ideas, Nature, and the Written Word. 2014
- Visiting Scholar, Center for Humans and Nature, Chicago, IL. 2013
- University Writer Laureate, Oregon State University. 2007
- Oregon Book Award, for Pine Island Paradox. 2007
- Distinguished Professor of Philosophy, Oregon State University. 2003
- Distinguished Alumna, Berea High School Hall of Fame, Berea, Ohio. 2001
- Sigurd Olson Nature Writing Award, for Holdfast. 2000
- Pacific NW Booksellers Association 1996 Book Award, for Riverwalking. 1996
- Oregon Book Award Finalist, for Riverwalking. 1996
- Choice Magazine, Outstanding Academic Book, for Pardons. 1990

== Works ==
- Moore's work has been published and anthologized in many places, including Frontiers in Ecology and Environment, Environmental Ethics, Conservation Biology, Audubon, Discover, Orion, Salon, Northwest Review, North American Review, Southern Review, High Country News, Field & Stream, terrain.org, Wild Terrain, The New York Times, The Washington Post, The Los Angeles Times, Hope, Yoga International, and The Norton Book of Creative Nonfiction: In Brief.
- Moore's first novel was published in 2016. Piano Tide is the story of a small Alaskan tidewater town that creatively disrupts a plan to sell its fresh water.

=== Nonfiction and Creative Nonfiction ===
- Take Heart: Encouragement for Earth’s Weary Lovers. Oregon State University Press. 2022. ISBN 978-0870711770
- Bearing Witness: The Human Rights Case Against Fracking and Climate Change. Oregon State University Press. 2021. ISBN 978-0870710728
- Earth's Wild Music: Celebrating and Defending the Songs of the Natural World. Counterpoint LLC. 2021. ISBN 978-1640093676
- Great Tide Rising: Toward Clarity and Moral Courage in a Time of Planetary Change. Berkeley, CA: Counterpoint Press. 2016. ISBN 978-1619026995.
- Wild Comfort: The Solace of Nature. Boston: Shambhala Press. 2010. ISBN 978-1590307717.
- Pine Island Paradox. Minneapolis: Milkweed Editions. 2004. ISBN 978-1571312761.
- Holdfast: At Home in the Natural World. New York: The Lyons Press. 1999. ISBN 978-1592283279. French translation. Petit Traite de Philosophie Naturelle. Gallmeister. 2006. ISBN 978-2351780046.
- Riverwalking: Reflections on Moving Water. New York: Lyons and Burford.1995. ISBN 9781558214088.
- Pardons: Justice, Mercy, and the Public Interest. New York: Oxford University Press. 1989. ISBN 978-0195113945.

=== Anthologies ===
- Kathleen Dean Moore and Michael P. Nelson. Moral Ground: Ethical Action for a Planet in Peril. San Antonio: Trinity University Press. 2011. ISBN 978-1595340856.
- Sideris, Lisa and Kathleen Dean Moore. Rachel Carson: Legacy and Challenge. Albany, New York: SUNY Press. 2008. ISBN 978-0791474716.
- Goodrich, Charles, Kathleen Dean Moore, and Fred Swanson. In the Blast Zone: Catastrophe and Renewal on Mount St. Helens. Corvallis: Oregon State University Press. 2008. ISBN 978-0870711985.
- Forbes, Peter, Kathleen Dean Moore, Scott Russell Sanders, Coming to Land in a Troubled World. Portland, OR: Trust for Public Land. 2004. ISBN 978-0967280691.

=== Edited volume ===
- Kathleen Dean Moore, et al. How It Is: The Native American Philosophy of Viola Cordova. Tucson, AZ: University of Arizona Press. 2007. ISBN 978-0-8165-2648-2.

=== Textbooks ===
- Kathleen Dean Moore. Reasoning and Writing. New York: Macmillan. 1993. ISBN 9780023833250.
- Kathleen Dean Moore with Erin E. Moore. Patterns of Inductive Reasoning: Developing Critical Thinking Skills. Dubuque, IA: Kendall/Hunt. 1986. ISBN 978-0-7872-4408-8.

=== Fiction ===
- Piano Tide. Berkeley, CA: Counterpoint Press, 2016.
