= Unbowed: A Memoir =

2006 autobiography by Wangari Maathai

- Author: Wangari Maathai
- Language: English
- Subject: Autobiography
- Publisher: Alfred A. Knopf
- Publication date: October 3, 2006
- Pages: 352
- ISBN: 978-0-307-26348-3
- OCLC: 65341312
- Dewey Decimal: 333.72092 B 22
- LC Class: SB63.M22 A3 2006

Unbowed: A Memoir is a 2006 autobiography written by 2004 Nobel Peace Prize Laureate Wangari Maathai. The book was published by the Knopf Publishing Group.

== Summary ==
Maathai talks about her life from childhood until she was given the Nobel Peace Prize in 2004. She discusses her childhood, education in the United States, and returning to Kenya and then her life as an environmentalist and political activist, culminating with the victory of the opposition in the 2002 elections. At the time the KANU party was in power. Maathai was elected to parliament and shortly after that was awarded the Nobel Prize. In the book she stresses a connection between environmental conservation, struggles and good governance.
