= Green Belt Movement =

Indigenous grassroots organization in Kenya

- Founded: 1977
- Founder: Wangari Maathai

The Green Belt Movement (GBM) is an indigenous grassroots organization in Kenya that empowers women through the planting of trees. It is one of the most effective and well-known grassroots organisations addressing the problem of global deforestation. Professor Wangari Maathai established the organization in 1977 under the auspices of the National Council of Women of Kenya (NCWK). GBM's successes in forest conservation, education, and women's economic empowerment have gained the organisation worldwide acclaim. It is also noted for its advocacy of human rights, democratisation of access to public lands, and environmental justice issues such as the role of women's traditional ecological knowledge in addressing environmental degradation and desertification.

According to their 2003 annual report, the mission of GBM is "to mobilize community consciousness for self-determination, justice, equity, reduction of poverty, and environmental conservation, using trees as the entry point." GBM is no longer directly linked to the NCWK and coordinates a national network of women's groups that plant trees and do environmental conservation and community development work. Their work combats deforestation, restores sources of cooking fuel, generates income, and stops soil erosion. Maathai has incorporated advocacy and empowerment for women, eco-tourism, and overall economic development into the Green Belt Movement.

Since Wangari Maathai started the movement in 1977, more than 51 million trees have been planted, and more than 30,000 women have been trained in forestry, food processing, bee-keeping, and other trades that help them earn income while preserving their lands and resources. Communities in Kenya (both men and women) have been motivated and organized to both prevent further environmental destruction and restore that which has been damaged.

Maathai received the Nobel Peace Prize in 2004 for her work with the Green Belt Movement.

== Background ==
Deforestation is a major contributor to environmental disasters, desertification, and climate change. The Green Belt Movement (GBM) is one of the most effective and visible grassroots organisations addressing these issues.

The Green Belt Movement was founded in 1977 by Wangari Maathai and the National Council of Women of Kenya, and subsequently grew into a grassroots movement for women's economic empowerment and land stewardship. A 2005 paper by the United Nations Research Institute for Social Development (UNRISD) stated that in Kenya, state expropriation of public lands for private use presents threats to the livelihoods and food security of peasants and the working poor, and that GBM is "deeply immersed" in the resulting struggles for control of public lands.

Maathai and the GBM connected the marginalisation of women and poverty to environmental degradation and promoted a grassroots approach to development by empowering women to control the environment. Their intention is to ensure that women have independent sources of income and also to conserve the environment through sustainable resource management.

=== History ===
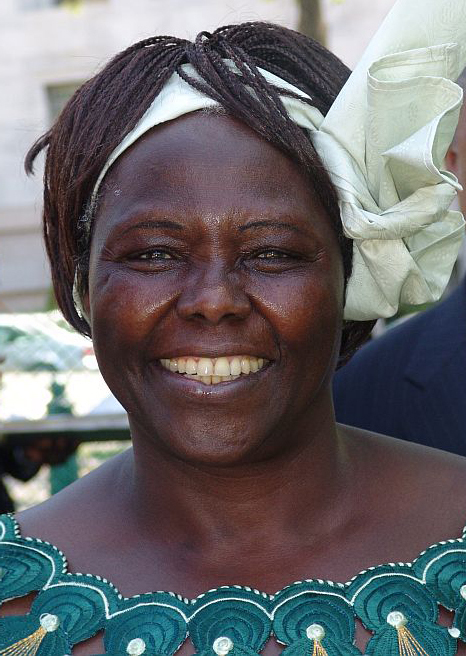
Wangari Maathai, initiator of the Green Belt Movement

Prior to the Green Belt Movement's founding, specifically during the 1970s, there was a restricted political opportunity structure within Kenya because the government at the time was very politically repressive. The Kenyan government was dominated by men and their patriarchal and repressive views, which created many issues for women. Many women throughout Kenya were struggling with feeding their families, getting access to natural resources (water, wood). Moreover, many Kenyan women didn't have any form of legal protection or say when it came to the politics in Kenya. Women were so repressed and treated so poorly that they weren't allowed to be in government or sit in on political meetings. Eventually changes within Kenya and its government occurred. The Green Belt Movement specifically played an essential role in changing the ways women were treated, excluded from, and used in Kenya. The framing of the Green Belt Movement as a non-threatening environmental conservation effort made an enormous impact on the government and communities during a time that many other forms of activism were seen as threats to the government. However, by encouraging women to question their place and challenge social and political institutions that keep women compliant the Green Belt Movement was eventually founded officially.

The Green Belt Movement began with Maathai founding the organization in 1977, but she founded the organization because of what she studied, taught, witnessed, learned, and wanted to change. She began with founding the movement, but prior to founding the movement she was involved she was a part of another environmental organization. Maathai served as chairwoman of the UNEP's Environment Liaison Center board, which today is called the Environment Liaison Center International. From serving as a chairwomen with the UNLEP, she later on in 1974, switched gears, and began focusing her time and energy on mitigating environmental issues. Maathai focused for efforts on battling deforestation issues, and how to fix various other forest-related issues in order to improve the overall quality of life for the women and children in Kenya.

Maathai began with introducing tree planting programs and regimes into local communities/ targeting communities with little access to basic natural resources such as water or rice. The first tree planting the GBH facilitate occurred on 5 June 1977, and involved seven ethnic tribes being honored through the planting of trees. It took place in Nairobi, the capital of Kenya, and trees were planted, marking the beginning of what would become an internationally influential movement that challenges the hegemonic structures of that oppress rural communities in Kenya. However, the tree planting programs and regimes took a significant amount of time for involvement to occur within communities. There were several trials done and eventually Maathai and the various employees of the GBM established successful programs. Maathai often told her coworkers in the GBM, "We are on a track that has not been explored before. We are on a trial-and error basis. If what we did yesterday did not produce good results, let's not repeat it today because it is a waste of time".

However, during the implementation of the tree planting program, the GBM also experienced many setbacks because of its lack of funding and support. This led to Wangari Maathai joining the National Council of Women of Kenya as a member of the executive committee. From Maathai joining the council the Green Belt Movement was able to get international attention and support from women and governments. The GBM also was able to gain much more help when it came to facilitating tree planting initiatives and educational programs. Maathai even was able to further the Green Belt's movement through expanding its public outreach (media networks/supporters), gain more funding towards tree planting projects/ climate change initiatives, and overall more support to ensure the success of the organization.

After joining the National Council of Women of Kenya, Maathai went on to educate communities and facilitate permanent outreach programs. Eventually the GBM implemented its tree planting program throughout Kenya. The Green Belt Movement planted thousands of tree seedlings in long rows to form green belts of trees, thus marking the beginning of the Green Belt Movement. "These "belts" had the advantages of providing shade and windbreaks, facilitating soil conservation, improving the aesthetic beauty of the landscape and providing habitats for birds and other small animals. During these local tree-planting ceremonies, community members usually turned out in large numbers. To conceptualize this fast-paced activity of creating belts of trees to adorn the naked land, the name "Green Belt Movement" was used." Because it gained support and funding from the National Council of Women of Kenya, the GBM was able to successfully continue its work and efforts throughout Kenya.

Through Maathai's attitude, persistence, and efforts, the movement gained a large amount of traction in Kenya and throughout the world. Eventually, the second tree planting occurred in 1979 and involved the planting of trees by hundreds of women on a rural farm in Kenya. After the second tree planting the GBM was able to continue to grow as an organization and they also were able to conduct a significant amount of research and studies on Kenya and its environmental problems. From the amount of research and activism the GBM continued to do, they were able to identify the need that rural communities and women especially needed. From their research, they started to consistently pass out seedlings to women and rural communities. The GBM also facilitated the implementation of income generating activities, and taught communities about environmentally sustainable practices.

After its second tree planting, and the establishment of several other projects and initiatives led to the GBM participating and facilitating a wide range of political activism. Specifically during the years of 1989–1994, the Green Belt Movement maintained its non-confrontational goals, while Wangari Maathai openly challenged the political arena. Maathai and the GBM partnered with organizations and community members throughout Kenya to advocate for environmentally sustainable practices, women's rights, and various other environmental problems. Moreover, throughout the Green Belt Movement, the organizers of the movement had been able to educate community members on non-violent resolution practices. Through educating the community on non-violent problem solving practices and on politics, the GBM in combination with international organizations and community members have been able to initiate changes within the Kenyan government, and social, political, and economic norms in Kenya. Moreover, women throughout Kenya have been able to participate regularly within Kenyan politics, which has forced changes in Kenya to occur.

Throughout the establishment of the Green Belt Movement, the movement faced a variety of problems and harassment. Specifically in the 1980s, the Green Belt Movement was being harassed significantly at the grassroots level within communities and at the central office. For example, the Green Belt Movement was evicted from the government-owned office they had worked in for 10 years. But nowadays, the Green Belt Movement highlights the focus on direct social and economic transformation of communities to ensure they are not identified as having a political agenda. By highlighting the lack of direct threat, this organization is able to function without alarming the decision-making elite who currently benefit from the inequities in Kenya. Moreover, the movement has made immense strides in helping local rural communities, restoring and improving natural resources and ecosystems, and educating/ empowering women throughout Kenya.

=== Gendered political context ===
"African women in general need to know that it's ok for them to be the way they are to see the way they are as a strength, and to be liberated from fear and from silence." – Wangari Maathai

Before founding the GBM, Maathai had done a variety of traveling, studying, teaching, and volunteer work, which allowed her to take notice of major issues occurring in rural communities from a global perspective. But when Maathai returned to Kenya in 1969, she began working with civic organizations. She joined the board of the Environment Liaison Center and became a member of the National Council of Women of Kenya (NCWK). Both these organizations allowed Maathai to gain knowledge, do research, and understand the issues taking place within her community. "While serving in the Environment Liaison Center, Maathai was exposed to conversations regarding the environmental degradation occurring in her own backyard. In the NCWK, Maathai listened to the voices and stories of hundreds of rural and urban women who suffered malnourishment and poverty. The decline in available firewood meant mothers could not cook their traditional foods. Instead they began cooking enriched white rice and other imported products that, although high in carbohydrates, lacked vitamins and minerals. Children were inflicted with diseases and malnourished" (1). From seeing the horrendous conditions women throughout Kenya were facing, Maathai connected the dots between environmental degradation causing and forcing large communities to suffer. The large number of issues surrounding Kenya's forest included deforestation, extinction of vegetation, harmful agricultural practices (crops and farmland), and high amount of soil degradation (soil erosion, sediment delivery, etc.). These issues impacted the people of Kenya so significantly that women and children were starving and dying consistently. Maathai took it upon herself to do something about it, which is what led to the Green Belt Movement being formed in 1977. From the Green Belt Movement being formed, it initiated women to become involved in the politics and in the various politics surrounding Kenya's natural resources and ecosystems.

At first the involvement of women began with the tree planting program and it slowly grew into even more than just the tree planting program. The GBM started passing out seedlings to women and teaching groups of women how to properly plant and grow trees on their own. The GBM also provided free lessons to women in rural communities so they could grow their own food and feed their starving children. Through the GBM taking a very hands on and invasive approach to improving the rural communities within Kenya, many women were able to get the natural resources they needed/need to survive and continue to grow their families. From the GBM involvement within Kenya, women continued to go to the GBM and seek help and resources. The amount of resource and support the GBM provided especially to women, allowed for women to become activists for the movement. It also allowed women to gain access to a variety of educational resources and join the GBM's efforts, activism, and overall contributions to rural communities. The variety of activism and political awareness that was sparked and continues to grow from the GBM can be evaluated through the lens of Black feminism.

Black feminism addresses the realities of intersectionality related to identity and the multiple forms of oppression, Black women specifically, experience. The concept of black feminism though was sparked and begin with Maathai. Maathai is responsible for initiating and growing the GBM, and overall spreading feministic views, knowledge, and educational materials throughout Kenya. She spread her feministic views and knowledge due to the fact she witnessed and endured a variety of discrimination, racism, and gender inequality throughout her life. Through her experiences in Kenya, she made it a goal for the GBM to incorporate empowering women and fostering their success. This in turn initiated Black feminism, which has become a known concept and a movement of its own. Since Maathai incorporated black feminism within the GBM, the number of women getting involved in their local communities politics, state-wide politics, and politics related to the GBM has increased dramatically since 1977. Women would typically not be aware or have access to political information or resources, but through the GBM, African American women have become involved with politics.

Specifically through the GBM, Maathai continued to foster black feminism. She did this through the GBM allowing women in Kenya to be key stakeholder in the organization. Being a key stakeholder has allowed for women to discuss and bring awareness to more communities and educate more women throughout the world. Moreover, it has helped to educate the leaders and organizers of the GBM so the GBM can effectively help and access communities that especially need help. The GBM also continues to foster black feminism through organizing seminars, speaking engagements, and various community based meetings/discussions. The organized seminars facilitated by the GBM, allowed women from various rural Kenyan communities to discuss their experiences of environmental degradation, political views, discriminatory experiences, etc. From the variety of discussions and seminars that take place, women are able to create solutions from subjugated knowledge to resist marginalization and cultural knowledge about their communities. The strategies used by the GBM and initiated by Maathai have contributed to benefiting women in Kenya tremendously and have allowed women to stay involved with the politics occurring in their rural communities.

However, even after the variety of support and momentum the GBM has gained throughout the years, the politics the GBM, and all women in Kenya face, are extremely controversial and patriarchal. For example, women are prevented from obtaining equal capital by the social and political restrictions in land ownership for women and being prevented from joining decision-making meetings. Luckily, the Green Belt Movement overall is an organization that seeks to mitigate oppressive practices by ending land grabbing, deforestation, and corruption. The GBM also focuses on educating women about politics and encourages them to take on leadership roles within the GBM (especially in the 21st century). The GBM even provides legal services and advice to women who are in need of help of any kind. Through the amount of activism and education the organization has spread, it has contributed to a shift in patriarchal norms and politics. Specifically, nowadays, the network consists of more than 4,000 community groups in Kenya that volunteer to protect their natural environment and practice day to day liberation for women. The number of people who have joined the GBM has made the roles of women and men's views toward women change in Kenya. The more the GBM influences and educates Kenya and its people in general, the more changes in Kenya's laws, women's roles, and overall environmental laws/regulations will occur.

== Activities ==
=== Key focus areas ===
The Green Belt Movement works in five principal areas known as "core programs"

1. Civic & Environmental Education
2. Environmental Conservation/Tree Planting
3. Green Belt Safaris (GBS)
4. Pan African Training Workshops
5. Women for Change [capacity building]

Each of these programs is aimed at improving the lives of local inhabitants by mobilizing their own abilities to improve their livelihoods and protect their local environment, economy and culture.

=== Areas of activity ===
The Green Belt Movement is involved in four main areas of activity that foster the improvement of the natural resources and ecosystems surrounding communities throughout the world. The four main areas of activity the GBM include:

1. Tree Planting and Water Harvesting
2. Climate Change
3. Mainstream Advocacy
4. Gender Livelihood and Advocacy

Tree planting and water harvesting activities are arranged, designed, installed, and overall monitored by the GBM. However, it also fosters communities to help conserve the natural resources and ecosystems around the world. The tree planting and water harvesting activities are conducted by the GBM through using a "watershed based approach". Which involves the GBM getting communities to contribute to conserving the biodiversity surrounding them, to restoring local/public ecosystems, and to reducing the impact of climate change.

A major area of activity for the GBM is focused around there Climate Change Program. The program that the GBM created focuses on reducing climate change, by providing educational resources/information to impoverished and rural communities. The program also focuses on raising awareness throughout the worldwide, targeting rural communities with educational resources, programs, and various other resources.

The mainstream advocacy activities of the GBM includes advocating "for greater political accountability and the expansion of democratic space in Kenya. GBM has called for, time and time again, an end to land grabbing, deforestation and corruption".

Furthermore, the Gender Livelihood and Advocacy the GBM is includes a combination of international and grassroots advocacy tactics. The GBM on a grassroots level focuses on creating "climate resilient communities through restoration and protection of forest watersheds, and the creation of sustainable livelihoods for communities in Kenya and across Africa. GBM's approach empowers communities to take action against climate change, the impacts of which are already being witnessed across Africa, through food security and water harvesting activities (adaptation) and planting the appropriate trees in appropriate places (mitigation). At the international level, GBM advocates for environmental policy that ensures the protection of natural forests and community rights, especially communities living close to and in forest ecosystems in sub-Saharan Africa and the Congo Basin Rainforest Ecosystem".

== Projects ==
The Green Belt Movement since its founding in 1977 has been involved a wide variety of projects. The projects that have been completed by the GBM are listed below.

- 1977: The Green Belt Movement was founded by Wangari Maathai in association with the National Council of Women of Kenya.
- 1980s: The Green Belt Movement established more than 600 tree nurseries who were installed by women throughout Kenya (2,500 – 3,000 women assisting).
- 1980s: The Green Belt Movement established approximately 2,000 public green belts carrying 1,000 tree seedlings on each green belt.
- 1986: The Green Belt Movement formed a pan-African Green Belt Network. The Network was formed to educate (women especially) on tree planting practices that are sustainable and environmentally safe. The Network was formed in several countries including Uganda, Malawi, Tanzania, Zimbabwe, and Ethiopia.
- 1989: The Green Belt Movement organized a large public protest against the construction of Times Tower. The Kenyan government announced its construction and the Green Belt Movement protested against the construction of the 459-foot skyscraper, located in Uhuru Park Nairobi.
- 1998: The Green Belt Movement facilitates its first indigenous tree plantings throughout Kenya. The Green Belt Movement also facilitated several protests in conjunction with the tree plantings in order to stop the degradation and privatization of the Karura Forest.

=== 2006 ===
- The GBM partnered with several organizations and tree nursery groups throughout the year. They ended up planting more than 4.6 million trees throughout Kenya.
- The GBM hosted several workshops that involved Civic and Environmental Education. The workshops facilitated education on tree planting practices, sustainable forest management, and the implementation of tree nurseries. Through the Civic and Environmental Education workshops a wide range of community members from Kenya communities participated. In total 200 new tree nurseries were installed throughout Kenya.
- The GBM launched global campaigns in partnership with several international organizations.
- The GBM partnered with the Work Foodbank and started work/created a new project. The project focused on implementing tree-planting initiatives throughout Kenya to counteract climate change effects occurring. The tree planting and restoring of forested areas took place in the Aberdare and Mt. Kenya Forests.
- The GBM partnered with the Kenyan Forestry Military to share information, organize current projects, and agree on the roles of their organizations/partnerships within their tree planting initiatives.
- GBM School Environmental Education linked school children to elders through community reforestation activities.
- 200 new tree nursery groups were formed throughout Kenya, and establishment of Community Forest Associations through the Civic and Environmental Education empowerment workshops.
- November 2006 – GBM launched a Forest Restoration Project in collaboration with the World Bank, at the 12th Conference of Parties (COP 12) on Climate Change in Nairobi.
- Two International Charitable Organizations were established: The Green Belt Movement International – North American (GBMI-US) and the Green Belt Movement International – Europe (GBMI-E).
- The Kenya Chapter of the African Union's Economic, Social and Cultural Council (ECOSOCC) was established in 2006 by civil society organizations based in Nairobi.
- During COP 12 in Nairobi, the Green Belt Movement launched the Billion Trees Campaign in partnership with the United Nations Environment Program (UNEP) and the World Agroforestry Centre (ICRAF).
- The GBM extended the "Mottainai" campaign to Kenya in 2006 to address the issue of waste management, particularly the common use of plastic bags which cannot be recycled or re-used.
- The GBM held Cultural Biodiversity workshops in 15 schools across Kenya.

=== 2007 ===
- 2007 alone, GBM communities planted more than 4.8 million trees in Kenya.
- GBM achieved planting seedlings on Kenya's five water towers.
- Educational scholarships were awarded to several girls who are a part of economically disadvantages communities and the GBM.
- The GBM partnered with the Kenya Army and planted 44,000 trees in the Kamae Forest. The trees were planted to restore the Aberdare mountain's main water catchment.
- The GBM facilitated and encouraged communities from all over Kenya to plant trees in order to restore the Mau Forest where it has been degraded or deforested. The GBM also mobilized several communities in activities on forest management, organic farming, and water harvesting. Through the activities the GBM facilitated they were also able to educate communities on and advocate against several harmful environmental practices taking place in the forest (ex. Charcoal burning and illegal grazing of land). They also were able to successfully plant more than 400,000 trees in the Mau Forest with the help of many local communities. However, during 2007, GBM did face problems and was halted from proceeding with their activities and advocacy within the Mau Forest. This was due to the large amount of post-election violence taking place in Kenya.
- The GBM's mapping facility (GIS) Geographic Information Systems Laboratory became fully operational for GBM field officers, educational programs and advocacy program's. The laboratory also provided a wide range of information and historical research on the current projects and future projects GBM plans to undertake. There projects range from tree planting initiatives, to installing tree nurseries, and planning carbon projects.
- The GBM's Bio-Carbon project (from 2006), received approval in 2007 from the National Environment Management Authority (NEM). The project also involved the GBM partnering with the Kenya Army to host a series of tree planting activities and exercises. The tree planting exercises took place in the Kamae Forest and involved hundreds of communities from all over Kenya participating in tree planting activities. Furthermore, the Kenya Army provided a wide range of logistical support to the GBM so the mass tree planting exercises and activities could be successful.
- The GBM continued to grow the "Mottaini" advocacy campaign. The GBM participated in advocating for banning the sales, production, and importing of all polythene bags (plastic bags) within the city of Nairobi. The ban was GBM advocated for the ban on plastic bags to help stop environmental degradation from occurring. The GBM under the "Mottaini" campaign also trained 10,000 people, teachers, students, business leaders, shop managers, civil society leaders and international volunteer groups were trained and educated on the significance of "Mottaninai". The training of 10,000 individuals within Kenya allowed for environmental degradation to be halted (somewhat) and environmental sustainability practices to be spread throughout rural communities in Kenya.
- The GBM partnered with its international organizations, the Green Belt Movement International–North America (GBMI-US) and the Green Belt Movement International–Europe (GBMIEurope) to organize and collect a series of resources for Kenya's GBM advocacy, project planning, and overall educational outreach programs. Through the GBM partnering with a variety of its international organizations, the GBM launched its Facebook page, website, and posted its first YouTube channel/video. Moreover, the GBM also was able to spread more global awareness and educational information (ex. Climate change, protection of the Congo Forest Basin) about their organization through their partners.
- Mobilized more than 5,000 community members through Civic and Environmental Education.

=== 2008 ===
- GBM communities planted 8.3 million trees throughout 2008.
- GBM launched the Climate Change Strategy which involves education, research, security programs, soil erosion controls, and mitigation strategies.
- GBM Climate Change Strategy engaged with the Kenyan government on its REDD policy. REDD is Reduced Emissions from Deforestation forest Degradation.
- Women for Change Program supported and encouraged women to take part in leadership roles and involved in political issues within their communities.
- In 2008, the "Women for Change" program awarded much needed secondary school scholarships to nine girls and three boys – nominated by the GBM Tree planting groups.
- From the violence that took place in December 2007, with 1500 deaths, and 500,000 people fled from their homes across Kenya. The GBM's Women for Change created the Peace Tent Initiative in area affected by violence. From a total of six community dialogues and 21 open meetings held in the most affected areas, led to the Peace Building Councils being formed.
- Seventeen corporate partners engaged in the GBM's tree planting practices in Nairobi which facilitated environmental conservation measures to occur.
- GBM acquired new Geographic Information Systems (GIS) software and trained 53 extension offices on GIS techniques and programs.
- GBM expanded its tree-planting partnerships with several Kenyan institutions, including the army, prisons, schools and churches.
- Supported the Billion Tree Campaign

=== 2009 ===
- The GBM planted several million trees but there was a severe drought and very bad weather that continued throughout the year. A large number of trees died and did not survive, or the seedlings did not take root at all.
- The GBM opened up its first Geographic Information System (GIS) laboratory and used it to determine the extent of deforestation and forest degradation occurring. The GBM also facilitated the use of the laboratory for teaching and educating communities on the GIS system and tools and used their relationships with local communities to map out severely degraded or deforested areas.
- GBM expands its advocacy and networking efforts through launching "Enough is Enough" campaign, winning two legal cases on human rights and protection of property, and launching the Lake Naivasha campaign to sensitize the communities.
- Involved in political discussions including the Shamba system, wetland management policies, and the planting of exotic trees in Kenya and in the Aberdares
- GBM's Corporate Initiatives in Urban Areas included a project focusing on the restoring of forest areas around Nairobi, Karura Forest, Ngong Forest and Ngong Hill.
- Promoted environmental awareness through tree planting projects throughout the year.
- In 2009, the Mottainai campaign received a grant from the Mainichi Newspaper in Japan. The goal was to plant 200,000 trees in Kieni constituency in Kenya's Central Provence on farms, public lands and degraded forest areas.
- Delegation to Copenhagen climate change talks: COP15

=== 2010 ===
- GBM communities planted 4,222,268 million trees.
- Kenya's first REDD "Training of Trainers" workshop.
- GBM partnered with the Kenya Forest Service (KFS) and Woods Hole Research Centre (WHRC) and held a Training of Trainers Workshop in August 2010 on Reduced Emissions from Deforestation and Forest Degradation (REDD).
- GBM partnered with the Clinton Climate Initiative (CCI) to develop and implement a forest carbon project in Enoosupukia Forest Trust Land.
- Conducted baseline biomass surveys of the Mau Forest in Kenya.
- National advocacy for the new Kenyan Constitution.
- GBM partnered with several organizations and planted trees in Karura and Ngong forests, which are the two major urban forests in Nairobi city.
- GBM partnered with AEON Corporation to target water catchment areas with degraded forest lands.
- In December 2010, GBM participated in the 16th United Nations Framework Convention on Climate Change Conference of the Parties (COP 16), in Cancun Mexico.

=== 2011 ===
Tree Planting Projects:

- The GBM completed a five-year rehabilitation project in the Aberdares specifically targeting the Sasumau, Ndakini and Gatanga catchment. The project established 593 tree nurseries, with 3.8 million trees planted
- The project also established 1.8 million trees on public lands (including schools, churches, cemeteries, roads, etc.).
- The GBM worked with the Save the Mau Trust and planted 212,000 trees in the Mau Forest Ecosystem. The project increased food security in the region and trained farmers on soil and water conservation techniques.
- The GBM partnered with thirteen companies to rehabilitate Karura and Ngong Forests located in Nairobi. The rehabilitation of the forested areas included the planting of 9,420 trees on 23 acres of land.
- The GBM selected the first Wangari Maathai Environmental Achievement Award Winner and launched the award in 2011. The project also promotes the planting of trees in a collaborative manner amongst many communities.

Advocacy and Climate Change Projects:

- Participated in the Collection of 1.2 Million Signatures to Stop Political Impunity.
- Published Climate Forest Finance Report at COP17.
- The GBM registered two Forest Carbon Projects in 2011 in order for communities to receive revenue from reforestation and carbon credits. In 2011 the project had passed a very intensive and demanding registration process.
- GBM staff and volunteer leaders advocated against a landmark land grabbing case at Nairobi's City Market.

Community Empowerment and Education:

- Seminars on the New Kenyan Constitution in 23 Counties.
- School Tree Nurseries Raised Scholarship Funds for Girls in Need.
- Launched the Environment, Health and Population Program.
- Climate Change Training for Rural Community Members.

=== 2012 ===
Tree Planting Projects:

- Tree planting occurred with the Kenya Armed Forces and several civil servants to help educate and manage their environments.
- Beekeeping in Samburu West Constituency was initiated as an ecological friendly source of livelihood. "Sample Kenya top bee hives were issued to 92 group members to start implement the developed bee keeping business plan. The tree nursery groups aim to increase the hives to 1,275 for income, increased land productivity and protection of biodiversity"(10).
- A total of 1,971,378 trees were planted in 2012.

Advocacy & Peace Building:

- 2012 GBM continued with its peace and reconciliation initiatives district of Nakuru County through a partnership with the Green Gross International, Sweden
- Completed a three-year Population Health and Environment pilot project funded by USAID in partnership with FHI360, Ministry of Public Health and Sanitation, Local Administration, NCPD, APHIA plus Kamili in Nithi, Nyeri, Tetu and Othaya constituencies. Climate Change Training for Rural Community Members

=== 2013 ===
Tree Planting:

- The GBM partnered with Waterstone, Norway and launched the Bamboo Biomass and Entrepreneurship project in 2013. This project is a pilot project that encouraged planting, propagating, and nurturing bamboo plants indigenous to Kenya. More than 1500 seedlings were planted in Maragua by women who had been trained for two days on how to grow bamboo effectively.
- The GBM finalized there plans for the improvement of the Aberdare Ecosystems, five major water towers in Kenya.
- The GBM was awarded a three-year contract to rehabilitate the Sondu Miriu River Catchment located in the Mau Conservancy. The GBM was awarded the three-year contract from the Ministry of Energy and Petroleum. The project was located in Chepalungu Forest in Bomet County and includes the Mau Water Tower and the Migori Watershed. Through the project the restoration of the degraded forest and watershed occurred and several educational outreach initiatives and activities occurred within rural communities.
- The GBM partnered with the Prince Albert II of Monaco, Yves Rocher, and the Schooner Foundations to integrate the rehabilitation and conservation of Kirisia Forest Watersheds. The project consisted of a three-year rehabilitation plan and in 2013 the GBM and its partners rehabilitate 55 Ha of degraded land within the Kirisia forest. The GBM also purchased a series of GIS monitoring tools which allowed the project to enhance its monitoring program and enforcement of the restored forested areas.

Advocacy and Climate Change:

- 2013, December, the GBM in partnership with the Green Cross Sweden, organized the first SPECO (Sports, Peace, Environment and Cohesion) Marathon. It was held in Rift Valley Region and two events were hosted in two different countries, Nakuru and Baringo.
- Training of Communities through Radio.
- Sustainability, Peace and Security: Conflict Mitigation in the Rift Valley Region.
- Climate Change and Women's Empowerment.

Community Empowerment and Education:

- Tree planting with the Kenya Army from October to November rainfall season. The theme of the tree planting was "trees for peaceful coexistence and biodiversity conservation".
- Initiated a project that empowers women and teaches them about alternatives for sources of clean and renewable energy. This project also focused on health/ hygiene teachings to women in the Manyattas homesteads, capacity building workshops on renewable clean energy, introduced clean cooking stove technologies, and facilitated the planting of trees.
- Facilitating and maintaining honey production and beekeeping to provide nutrition, incomes, community development and river protection.

=== 2014 ===
Tree Planting Projects:

- Bamboo Biomass and Entrepreneurship Project featured on the Climate Reality Project
- The Green Belt Movement partnered with the Global Environmental Facility / Small Grant Program (GEF/ SGP) and The Nature Conservancy (TNC) to restore Upper Sagana and Gura Watersheds in Nyeri County. The GBM also partnered with Jambo tours as well. Through Jambo Tours 26,000 trees were planted in the Homba Forest located in Mt. Kenya. The GBM's partnership with the GEF/SGP and the TNC planted a total of 80,126 trees in Kabaru and the Zuti forest
- The GBM implemented the restoration of the Chania Watershed located in the Aberdare Ecosystem. The GBM projects consisted of educating communities on how to protect watersheds and how to restore natural resources/ecosystems. A total of three workshops were hosted by the GBM in different communities to educate communities on environmental management practices.

Corporate Partnership Projects:

- Green Belt Movement (GBM) under a three-year contract by the Ministry of Energy and Petroleum to rehabilitate the Sondu Miriu River Catchment, in the Mau Conservancy is now in its second year.
- The GBM partnered with the Trees for Cities to facilitate a Nairobi Urban Greening Project. The project consisted of eleven schools from different areas in Nairobi and Kiambu Counties who learned how to plant seedlings. A total of 2000 seedlings were planted.

Climate Change:

- The GBM partnered with the Clinton Climate Initiative (CCI) and the World Resources and planted a total of 50,000 trees. The trees were planted in a series of selected sites along Gatondo, Geta Forest. The GBM and its partners also hosted six workshops to train communities and farmers on environmental problems such as climate change and poor farming practices.
- UNFCCC COP 20: The 20th session of the Conference of Parties to the UNFCCC took place in Lima, Peru from 1 to 12 December 2014.

Gender, Livelihood, and Advocacy:

- Integrated rehabilitation of Ewaso Ngiro (Kirisia) Ecosystem.
- A Sustainable Peace Project through Promotion of Good Governance, Democracy, Environmental Management and Peaceful Transition.
- Training Rural Women For Environmental, Economic and Livelihood Improvement in the Great Lakes Region.
- Smart Water for Green Schools Project.

=== 2015 ===
Tree Planting & Water Harvesting Projects:

- The GBM partnered with Mainichi Newspaper planted 20,000 indigenous tree seedlings in the Upper Sagana Watershed (Thingithu watershed), Nyeri County. Moreover, 30 farmers were trained on the adoption of environmental sustainable practices to improve community's livelihoods.
- The Green Belt Movement's Bamboo Biomass and Entrepreneurship Project (BBEP) promotes the planting of indigenous bamboo for a conservation concerns and measures. It focused on improving the Mathioya watershed within Murang'a County.
- The GBM facilitated the restoration of forests and watersheds to help prevent and facilitate restoration of environmental problems. The GBM partnered with the Global Environmental Facility/Small Grant Program and the Nature Conservancy. The projected ended up mobilizing more than 300 farmers to restore 150 kilometers of the Upper Tana Watersheds, in Kenya.
- The GBM is in the second year of implementation of the natural resource management in Chania Watershed of the Aberdare Ecosystem. This project continued to facilitate the strengthening of communities relationships, restoring natural resources that have been damaged, and providing education to communities on how to protect natural resources such as watersheds and vegetation surrounding the Chania watershed.
- Hosted students and officials from the NLA University College, in Bergen Norway and Ethiopia and provided lessons on tree planting and training. Climate Change Projects:
- The GBM partnered with the German Ministry of Environment, the Clinton Initiative, and the World Resources Institute to restore and improve the Malewa Watershed in Nyandarua County. The organizations planted 50,000 tree seedlings in the Geta Forest and trained more than 600 community members on environmental management activities/practices.
- The GBM continued work on its three-year watershed restoration project of Sondu Miriu River Catchment. The project continues to target and rehabilitate the catchment until the conclusion of the project occurs.

Community Partnership Projects:

- The GBM partnered with Oiko Credit Ltd to facilitate the Green Urban Schools Project. The project sought to plant 15,000 indigenous and fruit tree seedlings in five different schools throughout Nairobi County. However, only 2000 seedlings were successfully planted in the Kasarani Primary School in 2015.
- The GBM partnered with the Rockefeller Foundation to conduct a one-year project in Nairobi County. The project included the upscaling of tree nursery groups throughout Nairobi County. The project successfully planted and is producing 30,000 tree seedlings annually.
- The GBM was provided funding by the Standard Chartered Bank and planted 500 tree seedlings. The tree seedlings were planted at the Wangari Maathai Corner in the Karura Forest. The seedlings ultimately were planted to rehabilitate the Karura Forest ecosystem.

Gender, Livelihood, and Advocacy:

- Training Rural Women for Environmental, Economic and Livelihood Improvement in the Great Lakes Region
- Integrated Rehabilitation of Kirisia Watershed
- Smart Water for Green Schools
- Sustainable Peace – Cohesion and Integration through Decentralized Governance in Rift Valley Region of Kenya

== Activism ==
Since the establishment of the Green Belt Movement they have participated in a variety of activism throughout the world. They have gone from doing a very little amount of activism to expanding worldwide. The GBM does their activism through the Community Empowerment and Education program (CEE). The CEE allows community members from all over Kenya to come together and learn about human activities and how they affect the environment and cause environmental degradation. Moreover, the CEE provides a space for individuals to unite and discuss gender inequalities towards women in Kenya. The GBM from their outreach and activism has been able to get involved a variety of advocacy since their founding.

- In 1989 the Movement took on the powerful business associates of President Daniel arap Moi. A sustained, and often lonely protest, against the construction of a 60-story business complex in the heart of Uhuru Park in Nairobi was launched and won.
- In 1991 a similar protest was launched that saved Jeevanjee Gardens from the fate of being turned into a multi-story parking lot.
- In 1998, the Movement led a crusade against the illegal allocation of parts of the 2,000 acre (8 km^{2}) Karura Forest, a vital water catchment area in the outskirts of Nairobi. The struggle was finally won in 2003 when leaders of the newly elected NARC government affirmed their commitment to the forest by planting trees in the area.
- This activism has come at a high cost to both Maathai in person and to the Movement. The Kenyan government closed Greenbelt offices, has twice jailed Maathai and she was subject in 1992 to a severe beating by police while leading a peaceful protest against the imprisonment of several environmental and political activists. Whilst these have served as impediments to the Greenbelt Movement, they have not stifled it and it continues as a world-renowned and respected Movement.

=== 2005 ===
- "In 2005, Prof. Maathai and Mainichi Newspaper launched the Mottainai campaign in Japan. The goal was to mobilize the general public of Japan to use resources more sustainably in their daily lives. The term "Mottainai" is an ancient Japanese Buddhist concept that urged people not to waste limited resources, to be grateful for they have, and use what they have with respect and care. Prof. Maathai was introduced to the concept by Mainichi and has since adopted it as a global campaign symbolic of the protection and care of the environment. Through the continued support of Mainichi, GBM extended the "Mottainai" campaign to Kenya in 2006 to address the issue of waste management, particularly the common use of "flimsy" plastic bags which cannot be recycled or re-used"(15).

=== 2006 ===
- GBM raised awareness and educated communities on governance and the sustainable management of resources. The GBM also discussed peaceful solutions to issues on land clashes, evictions, and water/wetland/land appropriation rights.
- The GBM created the Green Belt Safaris program which allows tourists to travel around Kenya. It also allows tourists to visit different communities to get unique cultural experiences. The program hosted 595 guests and visits a wide range of areas.
- "The School Environmental Education project hosted an experiential learning opportunity for 60 students from Utafiti primary school into the Aberdare Forest. The goal of this excursion was to expose young students to the wonders of nature and inspire them to protect the environment. The total number of trees planted in schools this year was 22,000. In addition to field excursions, this project educated students of all ages on the importance of riverine ecosystems through the Leaf Pack experiment" (15).
- The GBM partnered with the African Biodiversity Network and hosted 15 workshops throughout Kenya to educate women on biodiversity and the issues associated with it.
- The Kenya Chapter of the African's Union's Economic, Social and Cultural Council (ECOSOCC) was established in 2006. This organization was founded/based in Nairobi and was used to encourage civil society organizations.
- During the COP 12 in Nairobi, the Green Belt Movement launched the Billion Trees Campaign in partnership with the United Nations Environment Program (UNEP) and the World Agroforestry Centre (ICRAF).

=== 2007 ===
- GBM in the Mau Forest taught income generating activities to women (Bee Keeping). They also hosted several advocacy campaigns against illegal grazing and charcoal burning.
- GBM opened up an in-house Geographic Information Systems facility so they could use it for monitoring and planning projects. It also allowed GBM to educate and advocate for several environmental concerns (ex. climate change, carbon footprint).
- "GBM and its sister organizations, the Green Belt Movement International–North America (GBMI-US) and the Green Belt Movement International–Europe (GBMI-Europe) worked together to mobilize resources for the program work in Kenya. In addition, they both supported the re-design of the GBM website, and launched GBM pages on Facebook and YouTube. This has resulted in better communication and higher visibility of our work. These offices have also worked closely together to promote global awareness and action on climate change, the protection of the Congo Basin Forest, "Mottainai" and the Billion Tree campaign"(14).
- In 2007, the Green Belt Movement endorsed the Forests Now Declaration, calling for new market based mechanisms to protect tropical forests.

=== 2008 ===
- Women for Change program (apart/ founded by the GBM) continued to encourage and support women to enter into leadership roles within the GBM. The GBM also continued through this program to support women with legal services, domestic violence help, and education on natural resources/food security.

=== 2009 ===
- GBM has opened up a GIS (Geographic Information Systems) lab which has been essential to the development of the GBM. It has also been essential to their project activities, initiatives, and planning, monitoring, and implementing projects. The GIS laboratory in 2009, received upgrades to their GIS software from the Environmental Systems Research Institute (ESRI). GBM developed a comprehensive spatial database to use for projects, environmental practices and various other initiatives they are concerned with or monitoring.
- GBM expanded its Advocacy and Networking program to provide more resources and education to any person who may need help. They also focus on issues such as land grabbing and environmental and planning regulations. The GBM during 2009 facilitated a protest to stop land grabbing and construction on forestland. The program also provided legal air and pushed for protection over wetlands.
- GBM sent a delegation to the 15th United Nations Framework Convention on Climate Change (UNFCCC) Conference of the Parties (COP15). The convention took place in Copenhagen, Denmark and consisted of talks that were led by Wangari Maathai. Maathai spoke at the convention several times and she discussed topics on the challenges with climate change, how to build resilient climate change communities and ecosystems, and how women deserve to be a part of the political conversations/problems occurring within their communities.

=== 2010 ===
- GBM with the Kenya Forest Service (KFS) and Woods Hole Research Centre (WHRC) held a Training of Trainers Workshop in August 2010 on Reduced Emissions from Deforestation and Forest Degradation (REDD).
- The GBM participated in advocating and educating the public on the new constitution passed into law on 5 August 2010. The advocating educating the GBM did was for the purpose for pursuing and pushing for environmental rights being included into law.
- December 2010, the GBM participated in the 16th United Nationals Framework Convention on climate change (UNFCCC) Conference of the Parties (COP 16) in Cancun, Mexico. GBM attended the COP 16 to advocate for "full and effective participation of women, indigenous peoples and local communities in climate change decision making"(13).

=== 2011 ===
- GBM partnered with 15 different organizations for "One Million Signatures" campaign. This campaign focused on the people of Kenya getting justice for the survivors of the 2007–2008 post-election violence. The violence that occurred happened after Kenya's Parliament withdrew the country of Kenya from the International Criminal Court. A total of 1.2 million signatures were collected eventually leading to the arrest of the four Kenya leaders in January 2012.
- The "Community Forest Climate Initiative" document was published by the GBM, and it outlined in detail the experiences either GBM members had while participating in the United Nations annual international climate change conference (COP17).
- "GBM staff and volunteer leaders advocated against a landmark land grabbing case at Nairobi's City Market. Without precedence, the Kenyan government revoked the title deed of the owner of City Market, Market Plaza Limited, and left the property vulnerable to private developers. Hundreds of workers own and operate stalls inside City Market, and their livelihoods were threatened by this illegal act. GBM, City Market stall owners, and the public gathered in downtown Nairobi to say "enough is enough"(12).
- GBM's Gender Program continued to promote and enhance various gender relations (focused around women). This initiative continued to increase awareness of gender issues within the Constitution in Kenya. The GBM also hosted several educational seminars pertaining to government issues, political questions/problems, and voter education (1200 women participated).
- GBM's Gender Program also facilitated and hosted several workshops for a total of six secondary schools. The workshops focused on educating children about tree nurseries and kitchen gardens.
- 26 Green Volunteers that are GBM's field based volunteers reached out to more than 800 households across four project areas, distributing the message that a healthy environment supports healthy communities
- GBM facilitated workshops on climate change and its impacts, and how it is caused. It reached more than 4000 community members.

=== 2012 ===
- GBM partnered with the Green Cross International Sweden and they both participated with peace and reconciliation initiatives within the District of Nakuru County. This initiated organized the 1st Children's Oeace Festival 2012, that mobilized 1189 Children, Teachers, Education Officers and Security stakeholders to gather at the Wangari Maathai Peace Park in Molo town.
- The Peace Tent League was organized in Molo and the League brought together ten teams from Molo comprising two women's football clubs and eight men's football clubs. The teams allowed for the community and young children to bond, participated in educational activities (besides sports) and build relationships amongst communities.

=== 2013 ===
- April 2013: The Bamboo Biomass and Entrepreneurship project was launched by the Green Belt Movement in partnership with Waterstone, Norway. The project consisted of encouraging propagating, planting and nurturing indigenous bamboo. GBM also hosted and conducted a two-day training workshop at Kitil farm. The event included training 24 women from Maragua on how to effectively and successfully grow bamboo. The event also taught women how and what they can do with bamboo after they have grown it.
- December 2013: The GBM partnered with Green Cross Sweden to host the first Sports, Peace, Environment, and Cohesion Marathon. This event took place in two different countries, Nakuru and Baringo and consisted of more than 300 people participating in the marathon. "The goal of the marathon was to reflect, celebrate and re-energize efforts aimed at strengthening sports, peace, environmental conservation and the deepening of peaceful co-existence of communities living in the Rift Valley Region through community driven and inclusive peace building events"(11).
- GBM partnered with Serian FM to help broadcast information that is afflicting communities' safety but to also enhance communities' awareness and education of natural resource management and sustainable development.
- The Peace and Reconciliation Project provided radio shows, promoted peace, providing training seminars on peace, and educating communities on governments and politics occurring throughout the world (not just in Kenya).
- GBM held a series of training workshops for a variety of environmental leaders. From the workshops the environmental leaders were able to learn about environmental stewardship and conservation practices within communities.
- GBM launched initiative to help women learn about renewable clean energy, clean cooking stoves/methods, alternatives to typical cooking materials, and the building of tree nursery groups amongst communities.

=== 2014 ===
- The GBM, the World Resources Institute (WRI) and the Clinton Climate Initiative (CCI) worked together to bring groups of farmers from 130 different communities together. The organizations hosted a series of activities to help farmers understand climate change, and understand how to counteract climate changes effects on their farms. The organizations also taught farms about water harvesting, fodder growing and kitchen gardens.
- The GBM, the Green Cross Sweden and the Folke Bernadotte Academy were involved in promoting peace in Nakuru County, Kenya. The project of promoting peace is based on Wangari Maathai's Three Legged Stool Concept. The project included training students on politics, peace and sustainable development. Moreover, the project hosted several seminars which focused on community empowerment.
- 25 September 2014: The third memorial anniversary of Wangari Maathai took place at Wangari Maathai Corner in Karura forest, Nairobi. This invent involved Hon. Justice Njoki Ndung'u joining the GBM Board members, staff, members of GBM's tree nursery groups, and the public to celebrate Wangari Maathai's life and her outstanding achievements including environmental conservation, sustainable development, democracy and peace.
- 1 December 2014, to 12 December 2014: The Conference of Parties to the UNFCCC took place in Lima, Peru. The GBM was a part of the COP 20 Sustainable Innovation Forum that brought together world leaders, senior executives, investors and industry experts to share ideas and accelerate innovative solutions to address climate change, accelerate green growth and sustainable development.

=== 2015 ===
- 2015 Community Trainers of Trainees were trained which allowed for more community members to receive training on water harvesting techniques and food security initiatives.
- GBM partnered with Green Cross Sweden in 2015, to promote youth and children peace building activities through hosting a large festival. The festival attracted students from schools and local communities and allowed them to learn about peace and to establish clubs that promoted peace within schools.
- Women from the United Nations and the Green Belt Movement celebrated in 2015, the World Environment Day and the Beijing Platform for Action. This day took place with hundreds of women and 500 trees were planted at the Professor Wangari Maathai corner in the Karura Forest in Nairobi, Kenya. This ceremony overall brought a variety of attention to Professor Maathai's work and actions while also spreading knowledge to hundreds of women on the environment.
- A celebration on 25 September 2015 for Professor Maathai took place and marked her fourth memorial anniversary. The celebration included a public walk from Jeevanjee Garden to the Freedom Corner in Uhuru Park, Nairobi. The GBM hosted the event and hundreds of community members participated in the walk.

== See also ==
- Black feminism
- Environmental racism
- Third-World Feminism
- African feminism
