= Franz Dolp =

American economist

- Born: June 6, 1936; Oregon
- Died: September 27, 2004 (aged 68)
- Education: Yale University; University of California, Berkeley
- Known for: Reforestation

Franz Dolp (June 6, 1936 – September 27, 2004) was an American economist and philanthropist best known for his efforts in reforesting 40 acres of cutover forestland in the Oregon Coast Range. After buying the land, he planted more than 13,000 cedar, hemlock and fir seedlings.

He earned a bachelor's degree in business administration from Yale University and a doctorate from the University of California, Berkeley. His thesis focused on farm labor in the Central Valley of California.

Dolp spent years reforesting a patch of logged land near Shotpouch Creek in Oregon, hoping to restore it to an equivalent status with old growth forests, especially Red Cedar-rich forests. He was killed in 2004 in an accident involving a paper mill logging truck.
