= Michael P. Nelson =

American environmental scholar

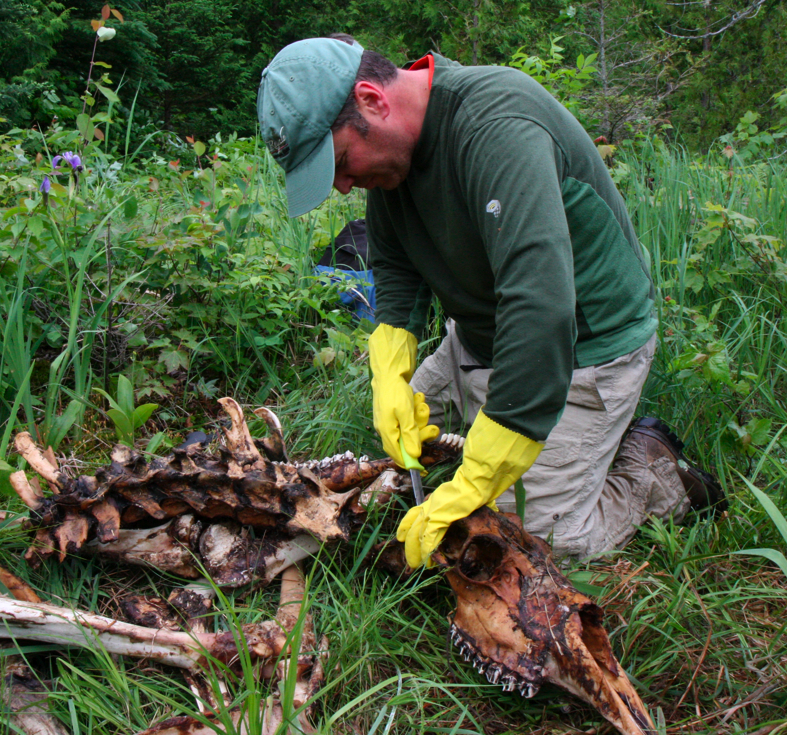
- Nelson in 2010
- Born: Michael Paul Nelson; Richland Center, Wisconsin, U.S.
- Occupations: Environmental scholar; writer; educator; speaker; consultant; professor

Academic background
- Education: Michigan State University (MA); Lancaster University (PhD)

Michael Paul Nelson is an American environmental scholar, writer, teacher, speaker, consultant, and Professor of environmental philosophy and ethics at Oregon State University. Nelson is also the philosopher in residence of the Isle Royale Wolf-Moose Project, a senior fellow with the Spring Creek Project for Ideas, Nature, and the Written word, and the director of the Center for the Future of Forests and Society. From 2012 to 2022 he served as the Lead Principal Investigator for the H.J. Andrews Long-Term Ecological Research Program and held the Ruth H. Spaniol Chair in Renewable Resources at Oregon State .

== Early life ==
Born in Richland Center, Wisconsin, and raised in Janesville, Wisconsin, Nelson earned an M.A. in philosophy at Michigan State University and a Ph.D. in philosophy at Lancaster University in England.

== Career ==
Nelson taught in the philosophy department, and held a joint appointment in the College of Natural Resources, at the University of Wisconsin-Stevens Point from 1993 to 2004, in the philosophy department at the University of Idaho from 2005 to 2007, and held a triple-joint appointment in the Lyman Briggs College, the Department of Fisheries and Wildlife, and the Department of Philosophy at Michigan State University from 2007 to 2012, before joining Oregon State's Department of Forest Ecosystems and Society in the College of Forestry.

Nelson's work focuses on environmental philosophy and ethics, philosophy of ecology, conservation biology, wildlife ecology and ethics/metaethics, American Indian environmental thought, applied philosophy, and wilderness philosophy. He is the co-founder and co-director of the Conservation Ethics Group, an environmental ethics consultancy group fusing ethics with social and ecological science. He has written articles, co-authored one book, and edited three books on environmental ethics.

== Awards and distinctions ==
Nelson was awarded the University Excellence in Teaching Award from the University of Wisconsin-Stevens Point in 2002 and the Teacher/Scholar in Residence Award from the University of Wisconsin-Stevens Point in 2001. His book, Moral Ground, won two 2010 ForeWord Reviews book awards - the Gold Medal for Anthology, and the Bronze Medal for Environment. His Conservation Ethics Group won the Phi Kappa Phi award for Excellence in Interdisciplinary Research in 2011.

== Selected works ==
- Kathleen Dean Moore and Michael P. Nelson (eds.). Moral Ground: Ethical Action for a Planet in Peril. Trinity University Press, 2010 ISBN 9781595340665
- Nelson, Michael P. and J. Baird Callicott (eds.). The Wilderness Debate Rages On.. Athens, GA: University of Georgia Press, 2008.
- Callicott, J. Baird and Michael P. Nelson. American Indian Environmental Ethics: An Ojibwa Case Study. Prentice-Hall, 2004.
- Callicott, J. Baird and Michael P. Nelson (eds.). The Great New Wilderness Debate University of Georgia Press, 1998.

== See also ==
- American philosophy
- List of American philosophers
- Environmental ethics
