= Maendeleo Ya Wanawake =

Maendeleo Ya Wanawake Organisation (MYWO) is a women's NGO that deals with issues to do with women's rights and gender equity in Kenya. It was founded in 1952 by a group of European women and was then under the umbrella of the Department of Community Development and Rehabilitation. It has approximately 600,000 groups contributing to a total membership of about two million women. Phoebe Asiyo served as the first African chairperson of the organization. It is currently chaired by Rahab Mwikali Muiu and has various agendas in its mission statement, including maternal, child health and family planning and training women in leadership and development.

Historically it was promoted by the British during their colonial rule over Kenya and helped provide services only for those against the Mau Mau anti-colonial uprising.

Ruth Habwe served as secretary general of the organization from 1968 until 1971.
