= Uhuru Park =

Recreational park in Nairobi, Kenya

Coordinates: 1°17′25″S 36°49′02″E

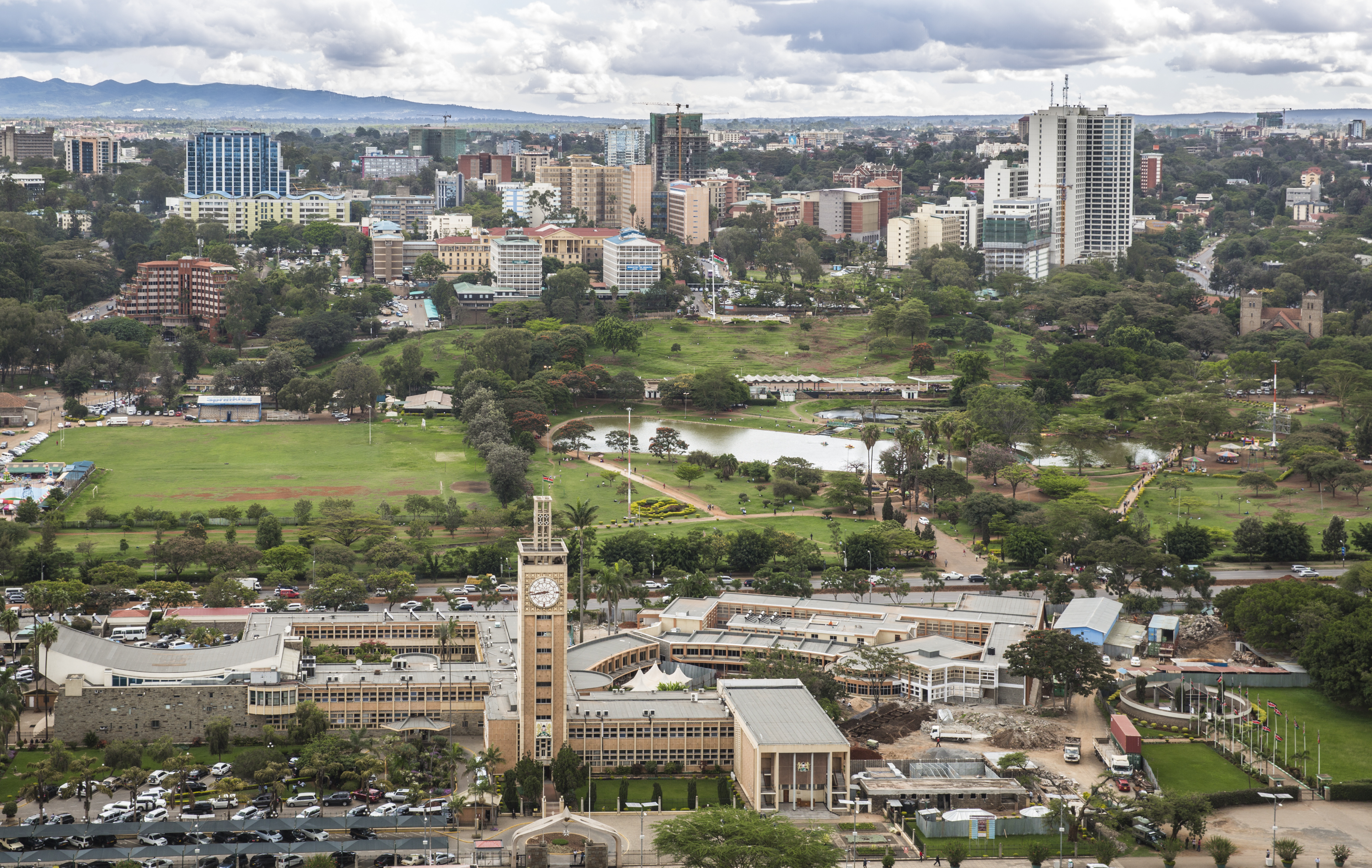
Aerial view of Uhuru Park

Uhuru Park is a 12.9 hectare (32 acre) recreational park adjacent to the central business district of Nairobi, Kenya. It was opened to the public by the late Mzee Jomo Kenyatta on 23 May 1969. It contains an artificial lake, several national monuments, and an assembly ground which has become a popular skateboarding spot on weekends and also a location for local skateboarding competitions (best trick contest 2017), catering to Nairobi's growing skate scene.

Apart from skateboarding, the assembly ground is used for occasional political and religious gatherings. It is infamous as the site where protest against illegal land grabbing was violently broken up by the Moi regime. In 2021, the park came under scrutiny for an attempted renovation which included removing old trees. A national court halted the project, due to environmental concerns. It has been closed since November 2021, when the park was fenced with blue corrugated iron and a green wire fence with sharp spikes. The park was reopened to the public on 30 March 2024 by Nairobi Governor Johnson Sakaja. Entry to the park is free and one is required to only carry their national ID.

== History ==
In 1989, Wangari Maathai and many of her followers held a protest at the park, attempting to stop the construction of the 60-storey Kenya Times Media Trust business complex. She was forced by the government to vacate her office and was vilified in parliament, but her protests and the government's response led foreign investors to cancel the project.

In August 1996, a group led by a Catholic cardinal and Archbishop Maurice Michael Otunga burned a heap of condoms in Uhuru Park.

Uhuru Park was the scene of a bomb blast in June 2010, which killed six people and left over 100 people injured. The attack targeted a "NO" campaign rally for the forthcoming constitutional referendum.

== Gallery ==
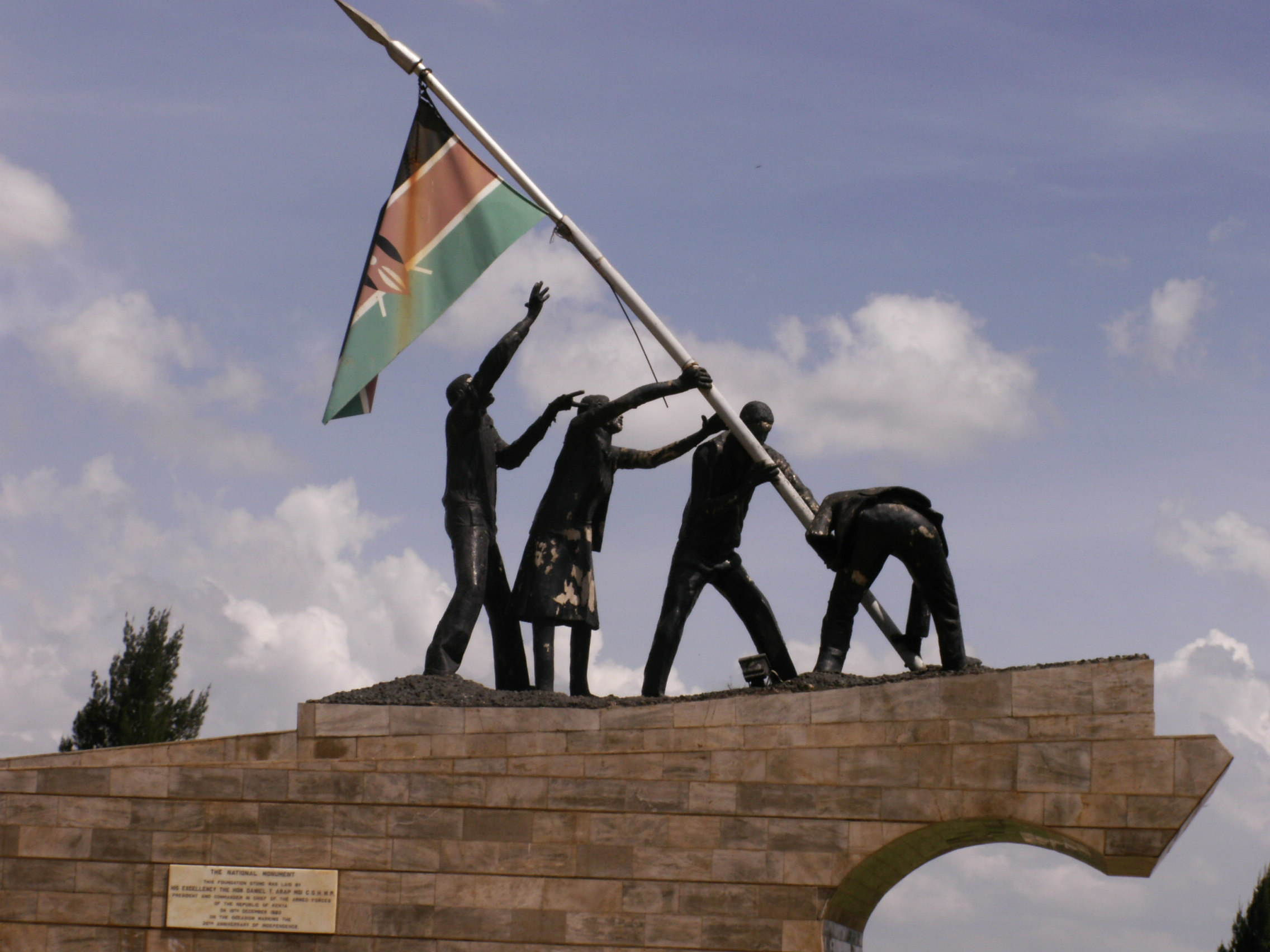
National Monument

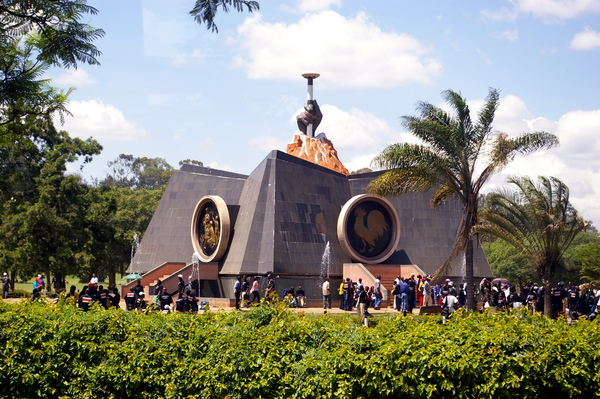
Nyayo Monument

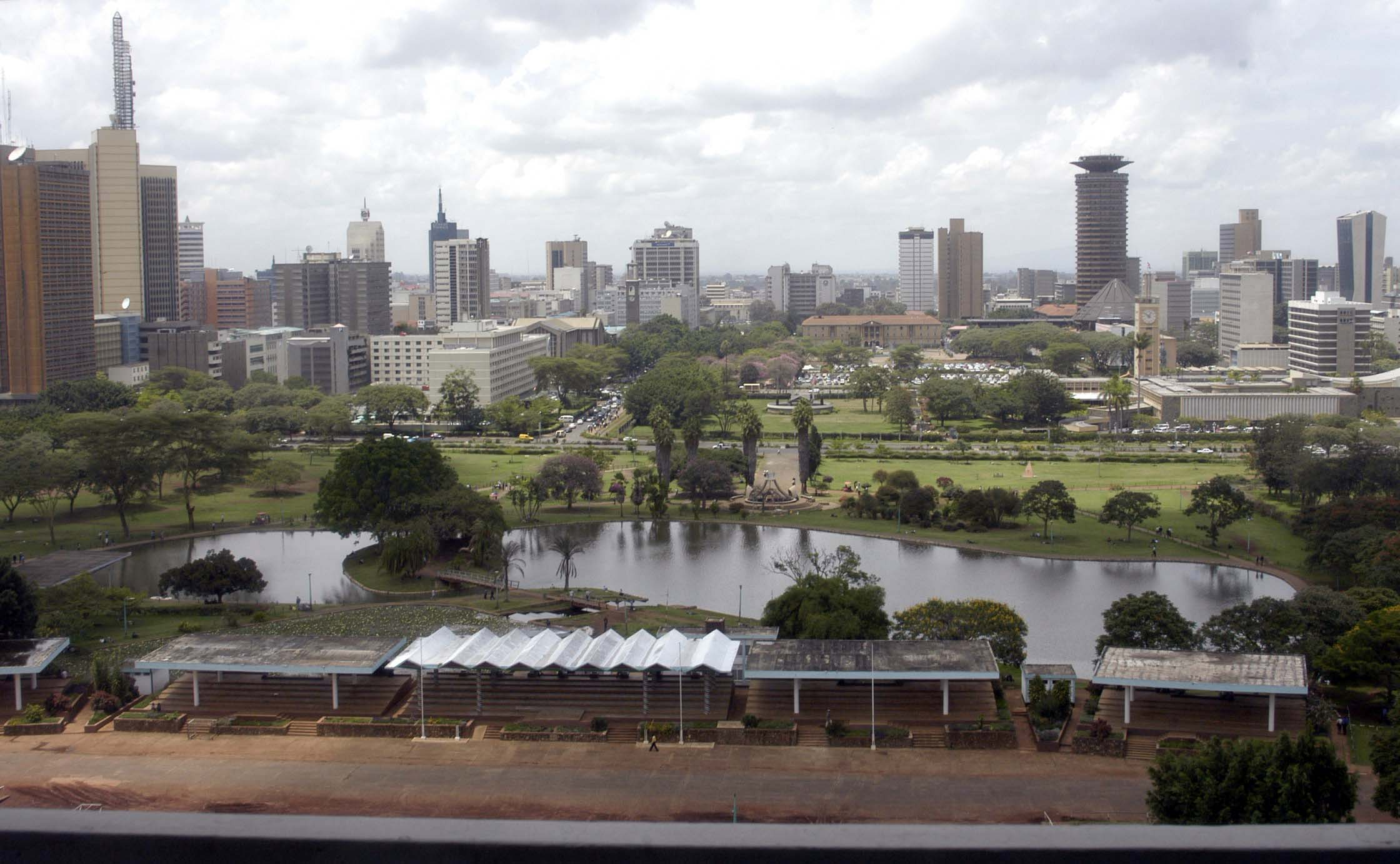
Nairobi skyline from the park

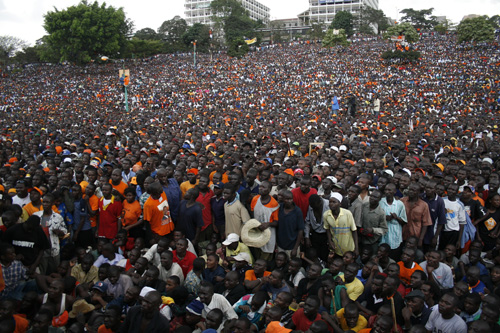
Orange Democratic Movement rally, 2007

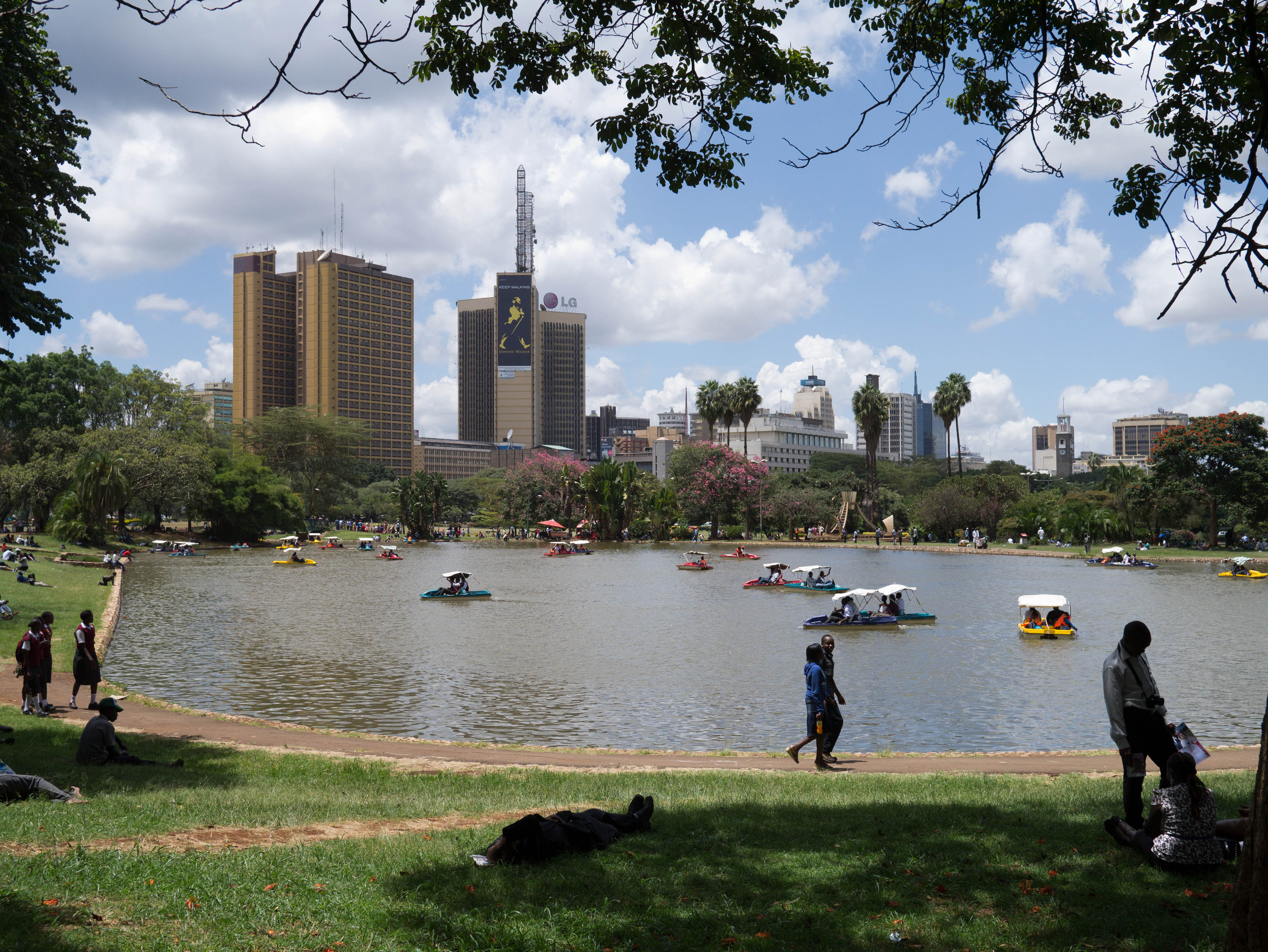
Lake

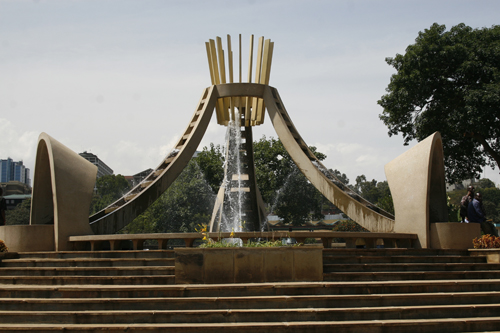
Fountain

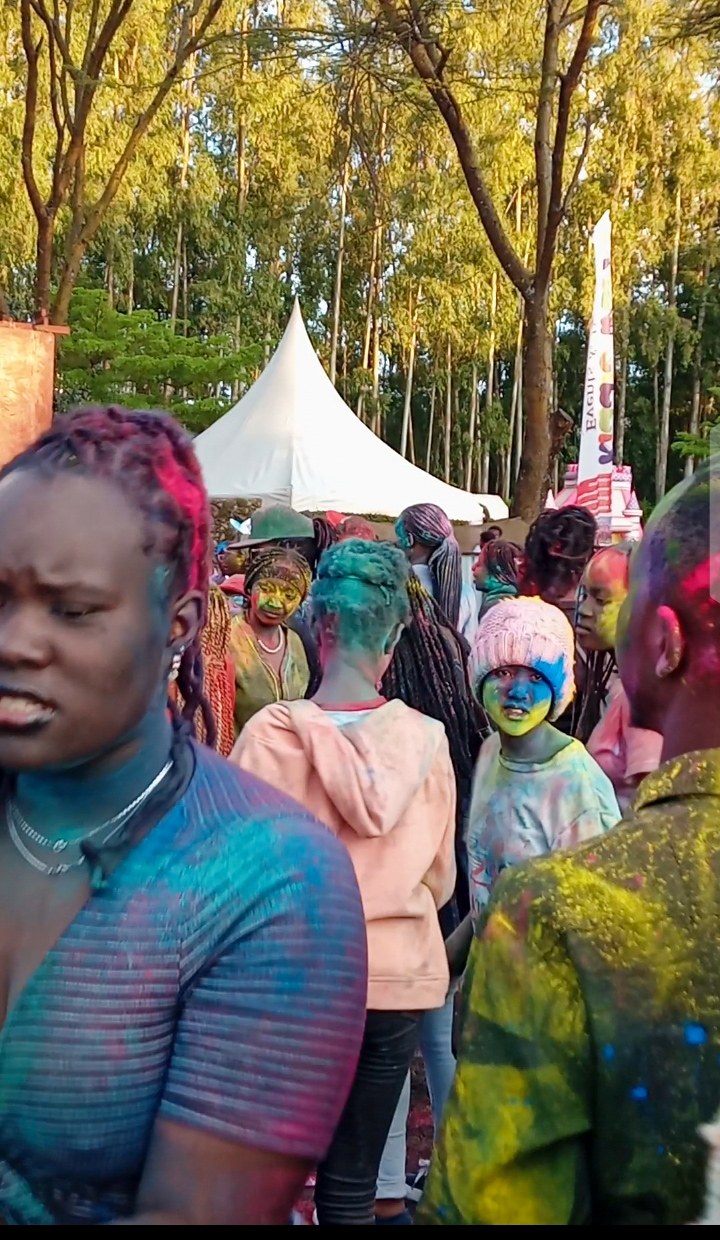
Nairobi Colour Festival 2026
