= National Council of Women of Kenya =

Council that coordinates various women's right groups in Kenya

The National Council of Women of Kenya (NCWK) was founded in 1964 to provide coordination among the various women's groups in Kenya. These included groups as varied as the National Nurses Union, Nairobi Business Women, East African Women's League, the Home Economics Association of East Africa, the Mother's Union, the Young Women's Christian Association, the Kenya Girl Guides, and the Kenyan Association of University Women.

The National Council of Women of Kenya affiliated with the International Council of Women in 1966.

In 1976, Kenyan environmentalist Wangari Maathi joined the organization. In 1977, she proposed the idea of planting trees to address deforestation in rural areas of Kenya. The tree-planting program was highly successful, and eventually Maathi created a separate organization, the Green Belt Movement, to expand her environmental efforts to other countries. In 2004, she received the Nobel Peace Prize for her work.

In 1979, Maathi ran for president of NCWK, but lost by three votes. She ran again the following year. She was elected president, and served from 1980 to 1987.

== See also ==
- International Council of Women
- Women in Kenya
