= Ruth Habwe =

- Died: 1996
- Education: Kabete Teacher's Training College, Jeanes School
- Occupations: Teacher, activist, politician
- Political party: Kenya African National Union (KANU) (expelled); Independent
- Movement: Women's rights in Kenya
- Spouse: Mr. Habwe
- Children: 5

Ruth Habwe (died 1996) was a Kenyan teacher, women’s rights activist and politician. She was one of the early leaders of the national women’s organisation Maendeleo Ya Wanawake and among the first Kenyan women to contest a parliamentary seat in the years immediately after independence.

== Early life and education ==
Habwe trained as a teacher at the Kabete Teacher’s Training College. She later attended the Jeanes School together with Margaret Koinange and Muthoni Likmani. She belonged to the Luhya community. She married and had five children.

== Teaching career and early activism ==
After completing her training, Habwe worked as a teacher. In the late colonial and early independence periods she became involved in organised efforts to improve the status of Kenyan women. She was among the pioneers of women’s organisational work in the country.

== Leadership of Maendeleo Ya Wanawake ==
Habwe served as chairperson of Maendeleo Ya Wanawake from 1968 to 1971. During her tenure the organisation adopted resolutions calling for the appointment of more women to the faculty of the University of Nairobi and for equal conditions of employment for women. These demands reflected the broader post-independence campaign by women’s groups for greater access to education, public employment and decision-making positions.

== Political career ==
In 1964 Habwe stood as a candidate for the Parliament of Kenya, becoming one of the few women to challenge the overwhelmingly male composition of the legislature in the first years of independence. She failed to obtain the support of the ruling Kenya African National Union (KANU) and therefore contested the election as an independent. The decision led to her expulsion from the party. Male members of parliament responded to her candidacy by telling her to “go back to the Kitchen and cook for Mr. Habwe’s children”.

Her independent campaign and the hostile reaction it provoked illustrated the limited space available to women in formal politics in the early independence period and the resistance they faced from both party structures and parliamentary colleagues.

== Later life and death ==
Habwe continued to be associated with women’s organisational work after her parliamentary attempt. She died in 1996.
