= Forest restoration =

Actions to reinstate forest health

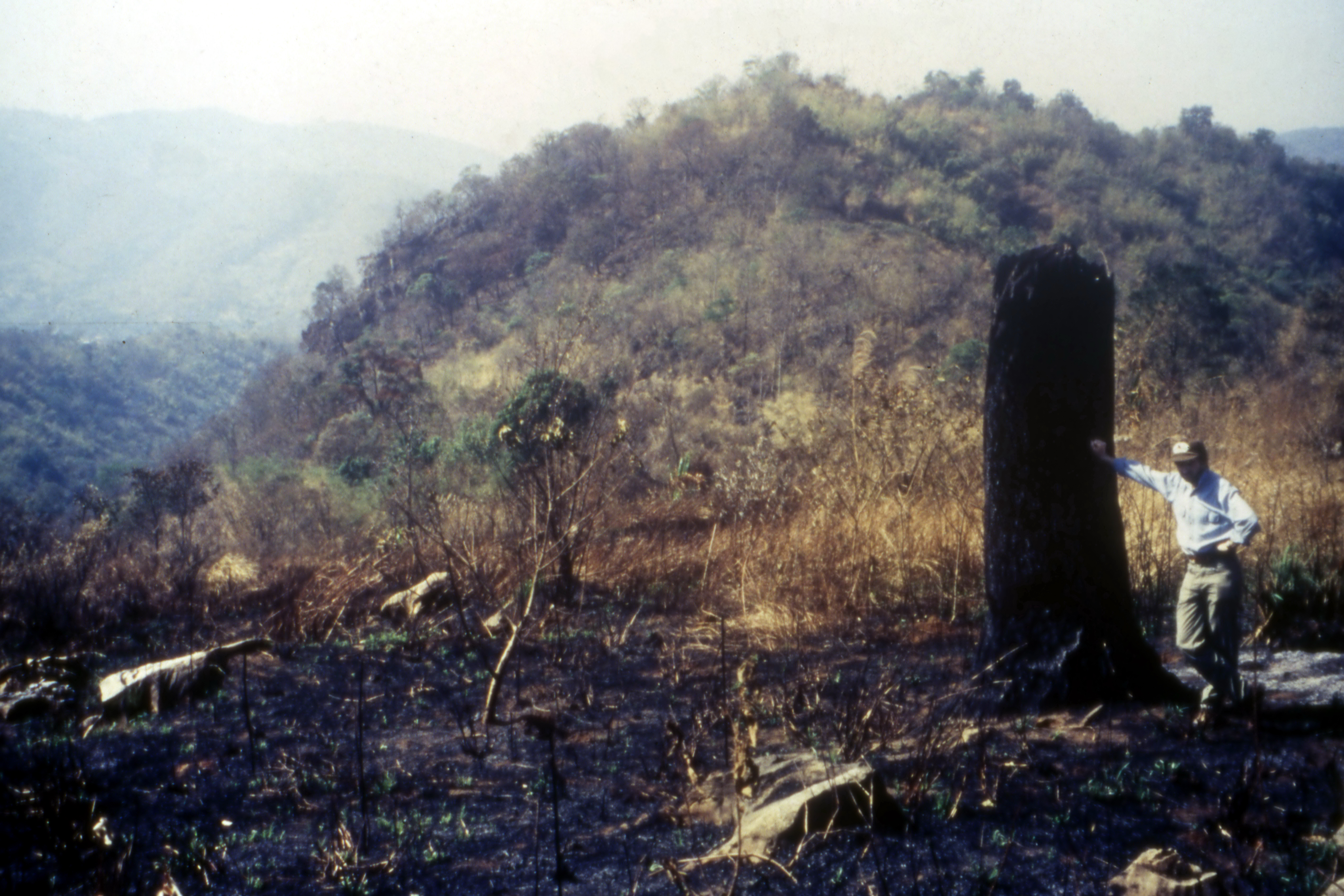
In the 1980s, conservation organizations warned that, once destroyed, tropical forests could never be restored. Thirty years of restoration research now challenge this: a) This site in Doi Suthep-Pui National Park, N. Thailand was deforested, over-cultivated and then burnt. The black tree stump was one of the original forest trees. Local people teamed up with scientists to repair their watershed.

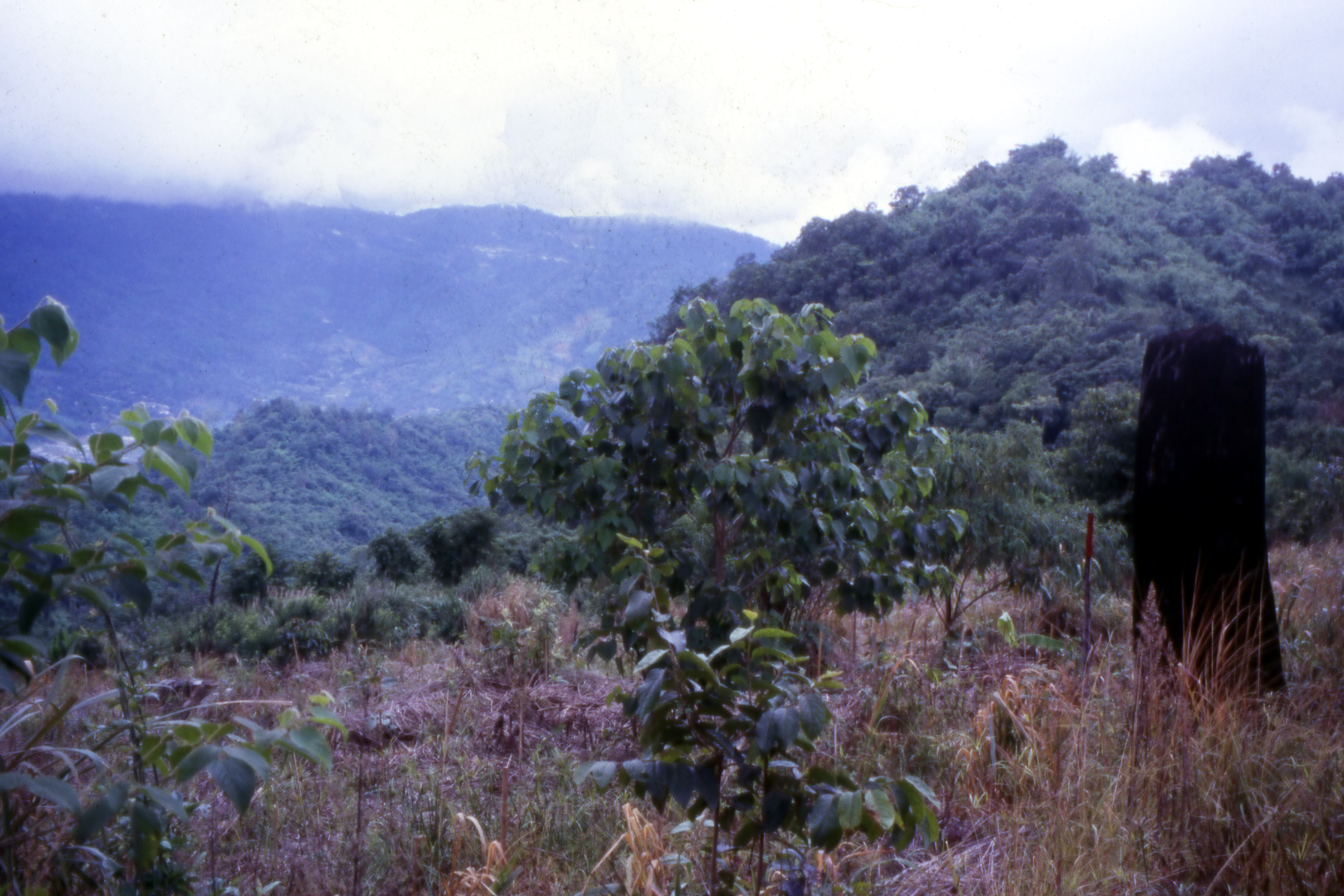
b) Fire prevention, nurturing natural regeneration and planting framework tree species resulted in trees growing above the weed canopy within a year.

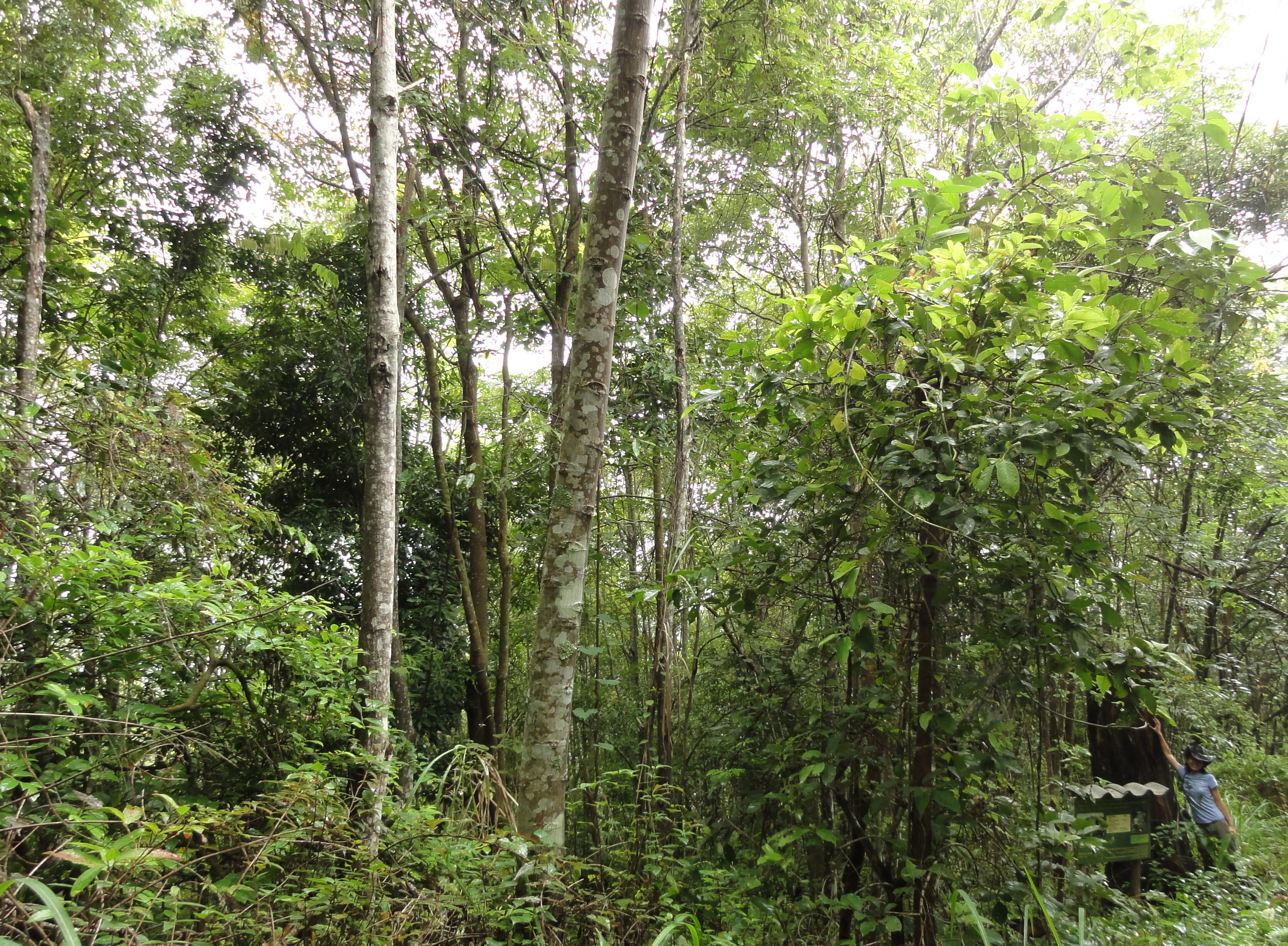
c) After 12 years, the restored forest overwhelmed the black tree stump.

Forest restoration is defined as "actions to re-instate ecological processes, which accelerate recovery of forest structure, ecological functioning and biodiversity levels towards those typical of climax forest", i.e. the end-stage of natural forest succession. Climax forests are relatively stable ecosystems that have developed the maximum biomass, structural complexity and species diversity that are possible within the limits imposed by climate and soil and without continued disturbance from humans (more explanation here). Climax forest is therefore the target ecosystem, which defines the ultimate aim of forest restoration. Since climate is a major factor that determines climax forest composition, global climate change may result in changing restoration aims. Additionally, the potential impacts of climate change on restoration goals must be taken into account, as changes in temperature and precipitation patterns may alter the composition and distribution of climax forests.

Forest restoration is a specialized form of reforestation, but it differs from conventional tree plantations in that its primary goals are biodiversity recovery and environmental protection.

Forest and landscape restoration (FLR) is defined as a process that aims to regain ecological functionality and enhance human well-being in deforested or degraded landscapes. FLR has been developed as a response to the growing degradation and loss of forest and land, which resulted in declined biodiversity and ecosystem services. Effective FLR will support the achievement of the Sustainable Development Goals. The United Nations Decade on Ecosystem Restoration (2021–2030) provides the opportunity to restore hundreds of millions of hectares of degraded forests and other ecosystems. Successful ecosystem restoration requires a fundamental understanding of the ecological characteristics of the component species, together with knowledge of how they assemble, interact and function as communities.

== Scope ==
Forest restoration may include simply protecting remnant vegetation (fire prevention, cattle exclusion etc.) or more active interventions to accelerate natural regeneration, as well as tree planting and/or sowing seeds (direct seeding) of species characteristic of the target ecosystem. Tree species planted (or encouraged to establish) are those that are typical of, or provide a critical ecological function in, the target ecosystem. However, wherever people live in or near restoration sites, restoration projects often include economic species amongst the planted trees, to yield subsistence or cash-generating products.

Forest restoration is an inclusive process, which depends on collaboration among a wide range of stakeholders including local communities, government officials, non-government organizations, scientists and funding agencies. Its ecological success is measured in terms of increased biological diversity, biomass, primary productivity, soil organic matter and water-holding capacity, as well as the return of rare and keystone species, characteristic of the target ecosystem. However, according to FAO, restoration activities face economic barriers ranging from a lack of large-scale funding available on behalf of governments to the limited resources and technical capacity of smallholders.

Economic indices of success include the value of forest products and ecological services generated (e.g. watershed protection, carbon storage etc.), which ultimately contribute towards poverty reduction. Payments for such ecological services (PES) and forest products can provide strong incentives for local people to implement restoration projects. Active restoration has been shown to accelerate the carbon recovery of human-modified tropical forests by as much as 50%.

According to FAO's The State of the World's Forests 2020, large-scale forest restoration is needed to meet the Sustainable Development Goals and to prevent, halt and reverse the loss of biodiversity. While 61 countries have, together, pledged to restore 170 million hectares of degraded forest lands under the Bonn Challenge, progress to date is slow. Forest restoration, when implemented appropriately, helps restore habitats and ecosystems, create jobs and income and is an effective nature-based solution to climate change. Moreover, according to FAO, forest and landscape restoration yields many benefits for the climate, including greenhouse gas emissions sequestration and reduction. The United Nations Decade on Ecosystem Restoration 2021–2030, announced in March 2019, aims to accelerate ecosystem restoration action worldwide.

== Opportunities for forest restoration ==
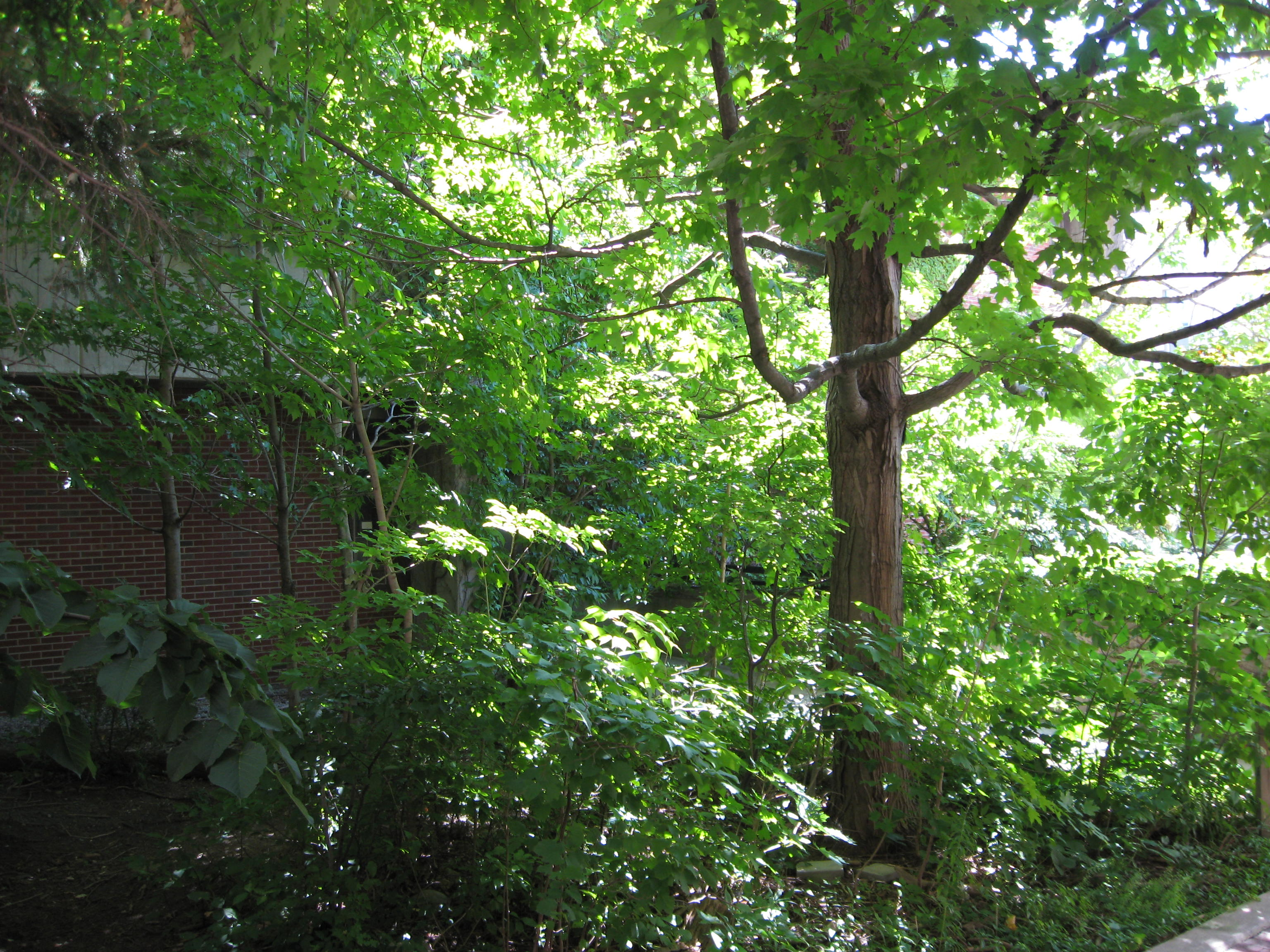
Demonstration forest restoration plot, SUNY-ESF, Syracuse, New York

Forest restoration is appropriate wherever biodiversity recovery is one of the main goals of reforestation, such as for wildlife conservation, environmental protection, eco-tourism or to supply a wide variety of forest products to local communities. Forests can be restored in a wide range of circumstances, but degraded sites within protected areas are a high priority, especially where some climax forest remains as a seed source within the landscape. Even in protected areas, there are often large deforested sites: logged over areas or sites formerly cleared for agriculture. If protected areas are to act as Earth's last wildlife refuges, restoration of such areas will be needed.

Many restoration projects are now being implemented under the umbrella of "forest landscape restoration" (FLR), defined as a "planned process to regain ecological integrity and enhance human well-being in deforested or degraded landscapes". FLR recognizes that forest restoration has social and economic functions. It aims to achieve the best possible compromise between meeting both conservation goals and the needs of rural communities. As human pressure on landscapes increases, forest restoration will most commonly be practiced within a mosaic of other forms of forest management, to meet the economic needs of local people.

A recent focal area for forest restoration efforts is within the urban context, where both people and biodiversity will benefit, however this context presents unique challenges.

== Natural regeneration ==
Tree planting is not always essential to restore forest ecosystems. A lot can be achieved by studying how forests regenerate naturally, identifying the factors that limit regeneration and devising methods to overcome them. These can include weeding and adding fertilizer around natural tree seedlings, preventing fire, removing cattle and so on. This is "accelerated" or "assisted" natural regeneration. It is simple and cost-effective, but it can only operate on trees that are already present, mostly light-loving pioneer species. Such tree species are not usually those that comprise climax forests, but they can foster recolonization of the site by shade-tolerant climax forest tree species, via natural seed dispersal from remnant forest. Because this is a slow process, biodiversity recovery can usually be accelerated by planting some climax forest tree species, especially large-seeded, poorly dispersed species. It is not feasible to plant all the tree species that may have formerly grown in the original primary forest and it is usually unnecessary to do so, if the framework species method can be used.

In some exceptional cases, particularly some Alaskan boreal forests, the long-term recovery from wildfires could offset the carbon emitted during the fires due to a change in tree species if the trees persist, prove to become part of resilient biomes and are about as numerous as the former forests'.

=== Protecting regeneration areas from browsing animals ===
Forest in the process of restoration face many challenges, such as seed and nutrient availability, but are notable susceptible to browsing animals. Although browsing animals are necessary in maintaining the understory of forests, they can easily over-graze a freshly replanted swath of forest, where young samplings are easily accessible. Over-grazing is particularly problematic in this case as the samplings and other young plants may be damaged beyond the point of recovery, resulting in a decrease in biodiversity. Care must be taken to use "deer fencing" to protect the regeneration area, or where not financially possible, to plant trees which prioritize structural growth and recovery.

== Post-fire regeneration ==
In large parts of the world, forest fires cover a heavy toll on forests. That can be because of provoked deforestation in order to substitute forests by crop areas, or in dry areas, because of wild fires occurring naturally or intentionally. A whole section of forest landscape restoration in linked to this particular problem, as in many cases, the net loss of ecosystem value is very high and can open the drop to an accelerated further degradation of the soil conditions through erosion and desertification. This indeed has dire consequences on both the quality of the habitats and their related fauna. Nevertheless, in some specific cases, wild fires do actually allow to increase the biodiversity index of the burnt area, in which case the Forest Restoration Strategies tend to look for a different land-use.

== Forest restoration projects ==
A study finds that almost 300 million people live on tropical forest restoration opportunity land in the Global South, constituting a large share of low-income countries' populations, and argues for prioritized inclusion of "local communities" in forest restoration projects. Project Drawdown lists the restoration of tropical forests as one of the most important solutions for climate change mitigation due to its extraordinary potential to sequestrate carbon and recommends that "local communities need to have a stake in what is growing, if restoration is to sustain." A recent FAO publication reports that Indigenous Peoples are among those facing the greatest risk to their well-being and livelihoods from the effects of climate change, and therefore must be centred in forest restoration and conservation.

=== Ashland Forest Resiliency Stewardship Project ===
The Ashland Forest Resiliency Stewardship Project (AFR) is a decade long, science-based project launched in 2010 with the intent of reducing severe wildfire risk, but also protecting water quality, old-growth forest, wildlife, people, property, and the overall quality of life within the Ashland watershed. The primary stakeholders in this cooperative restoration effort are the U.S. Forest Service, the City of Ashland, Lomakatsi Restoration Project, and The Nature Conservancy. The project was launched with initial funding from the Economic Recovery stimulus, and received funding from the Forest Service Hazardous Fuels program and the Joint Chiefs Landscape Restoration Partnerships program to back the project through 2016.

Located in the dry forests of southern Oregon, the threat of wildfire is a reality for land managers and property owners alike. The boundaries of the city of Ashland intersect with the surrounding forest in what is referred to as the wildland–urban interface (WUI). Historically, the forests of this region experienced a relatively frequent fire return interval, which prevented buildup of heavy fuel loads. A century of fire exclusion and suppression on federal lands in the Pacific Northwest has led to increased forest density and fuel loads, and thus a more persistent threat of devastating wildfire.

The AFR project has implemented restoration techniques and prescriptions that aim to replicate the process of ecological succession in dry, mixed-conifer forests of the Pacific Northwest. The approach involves a combination of fuels reduction, thinning small-diameter trees, and carrying out prescribed burns. Priority is given to maintaining ecological function and complexity by retaining the largest and oldest trees, preserving wildlife habitat and riparian areas, and protecting erodible soils and maintaining slope stability.

Since its inception in 2010, the AFR project has provided educational experiences to thousands of students and has benefitted the local community by creating jobs and providing workforce training. About 13,000 acres treated in the AFR project was in maintenance status as of February 2022, and Oregon's Landscape Resiliency Program, established through Senate Bill 762, is funding brush cutting and low-intensity burns to ecologically benefit a fire-adapted forest.

=== Accelerating forest regeneration with Agricultural Waste ===
In 1998, Costa Rican initiatives were set to regenerate deforested areas, formerly used as cattle pasture. This land was compacted and the soil was depleted, making natural regeneration more difficult. As a partnership with agricultural waste disposals, approximately 12 000 Mg of orange peels and pulp were applied to a 3 hectare segment of the former pastures. This addition of biomass to the soil allowed for a 176% increase in woody plant growth, increased species richness, tripled tree evenness (measured through the Shannon Index), and significantly elevated soil nutrient levels, measured at 2 and 16 years following the application (Truer et al. 2018). A significant increase in canopy closure was also observed using hemispheric topography, further suggesting that agricultural waste may play a larger role in future forest restoration.

== Forest landscape restoration ==
Forest landscape restoration (FLR) is defined as "a planned process to regain ecological integrity and enhance human well-being in deforested or degraded landscapes." It comprises tools and procedures to integrate site-level forest restoration actions with desirable landscape-level objectives, which are decided upon via various participatory mechanisms among stakeholders. The concept has grown out of collaboration among some of the world's major international conservation organizations including the International Union for Conservation of Nature (IUCN), the World Wide Fund for Nature (WWF), the World Resources Institute and the International Tropical Timber Organization (ITTO).

=== Aims ===
The concept of FLR was conceived to bring about compromises between meeting the needs of both humans and wildlife, by restoring a range of forest functions at the landscape level. It includes actions to strengthen the resilience and ecological integrity of landscapes and thereby keep future management options open. The participation of local communities is central to the concept, because they play a critical role in shaping the landscape and gain significant benefits from restored forest resources. Therefore, FLR activities are inclusive and participatory.

=== Desirable outcomes ===
The desirable outcomes of an FLR program usually comprise a combination of the following, depending on local needs and aspirations:

- Identification of the root causes of forest degradation and prevention of further deforestation,
- Positive engagement of people in the planning of forest restoration, resolution of land-use conflicts and agreement on benefit-sharing systems,
- Compromises over land-use trade-offs that are acceptable to the majority of stakeholders,
- A repository of biological diversity of both local and global value,
- Delivery of a range of utilitarian benefits to local communities including:
  - a reliable supply of clean water,
  - environmental protection particularly watershed services (e.g. reduced soil erosion, lower landslide risk, flood/drought mitigation etc.),
  - a sustainable supply of a diverse range of forest products including foods, medicines, firewood etc.,
  - monetary income from various sources e.g. ecotourism, carbon trading via the REDD+ mechanism and from payments for other environmental services (PES).

=== Activities ===
FLR combines several existing principles and techniques of development, conservation and natural resource management, such as landscape character assessment, participatory rural appraisal, adaptive management etc. within a clear and consistent evaluation and learning framework. An FLR program may comprise various forestry practices on different sites within the landscape, depending on local environmental and socioeconomic factors. These may include protection and management of secondary and degraded primary forests, standard forest restoration techniques such as "assisted" or "accelerated" natural regeneration (ANR) and the planting of framework tree species to restore degraded areas, as well as conventional tree plantations and agroforestry systems to meet more immediate monetary needs.

The IUCN hosts the Global Partnership on Forest Landscape Restoration, which co-ordinates development of the concept around the world.

In 2014, the Food and Agricultural Organization of the United Nations established the Forest and Landscape Restoration Mechanism. The Mechanism supports countries to implement FLR as a contribution to achieving the Bonn Challenge—the restoration of 150 million hectare of deforested and degraded lands by 2020—and the Convention on Biological Diversity Aichi Biodiversity Targets—related to ecosystem conservation and restoration.

In partnership with the Global Mechanism of the United Nations Convention to Combat Desertification, FAO released two discussion papers on sustainable financing for FLR in 2015. Sustainable Financing for Forest and Landscape Restoration: The Role of Public Policy Makers provides recommendations and examples of FLR financing for countries. Sustainable Financing for Forest and Landscape Restoration – Opportunities, challenges and the way forward provides an overview of funding sources and financial instruments available for FLR activities.

=== Financing ===
To finance the planning and implementation of forest and landscape restoration (FLR) activities, the Food and Agriculture Organization of the United Nations (FAO) has identified diverse financial mechanisms that are tailored to different stages of the FLR process and cover the transaction and the scaling-up of enterprises for sustainable restoration. Several options are available to finance restoration. To meet the unique demands of individual FLR projects, it is critical to identify the best landscape financing strategy. Financial options that generate diverse incentives for local actors may either be for-profit mechanisms, such as debt or loans, or not-for-profit mechanisms, including grants, fiscal policies, or expenses by the public sector. According to FAO, bridging the gap between smallholders and investors, coordinating investment, promoting local ownership of FLR financing strategies, and developing bankable projects and blended financial mechanisms generate positive outcomes for FLR impact at scale.

== See also ==
- Reforestation
- Restoration ecology
- Secondary forest
- Mangrove restoration
- Land restoration
- Proforestation
- International Day of Forests

== Sources ==
This article incorporates text from a free content work. Licensed under CC BY-SA 3.0 IGO (license statement/permission). Text taken from The State of the World's Forests 2020. Forests, biodiversity and people – In brief, FAO & UNEP, FAO & UNEP.
