= Land restoration =

Process of restoring land to a different state

Land restoration, which may include renaturalisation or rewilding, is the process of restoring land to a different or previous state with an intended purpose. That purpose can be a variety of things such as what follows: being safe for humans, plants, and animals; stabilizing ecological communities; cleaning up pollution; creating novel ecosystems; or restoring the land to a historical condition, for example how indigenous people managed the land.

Ecological destruction or degradation, to which land restoration serves as an antidote, is usually the consequence of human influence's intended or unintended consequences. This can include pollution, deforestation, salination, or species endangerment, among many more. Land restoration is not the same as land reclamation, where existing ecosystems are altered or destroyed to give way for cultivation or construction. Land restoration can enhance the supply of valuable ecosystem services that benefit people.

== Initial steps ==
In order to increase the chances for successful landscape restoration, several key parameters need to be determined. A shared understanding of the definition of restoration should be defined for the project. As there can be many different motivations for landscape restoration – influenced by personal or environmental ethics, opinions, priorities, available data, economics, etc. – the definition of the term can mean different things to different people and has changed over time. Additionally, in order to monitor the success of a restoration project, a reference model or reference ecosystem should be selected in order to make comparisons. Along with this, proper surveys of existing conditions should take place. Furthermore, design considerations like restoration methods, contingency plans, monitoring, maintenance, permits, resources, budget, and timeline need to be known and will influence landscape restoration capabilities.

== Adaptive management ==
Adaptive management is "an approach for simultaneously managing and learning about natural resources." It is the primary method used in managing land restoration projects, as natural resources can respond to management interventions; however, the durability and desirability of these responses are uncertain and depend on a combination of controllable and uncontrollable factors. Therefore, adapting how a project is managed based on responses from the ecosystem is a more informed approach to landscape restoration.

== Traditional ecological knowledge ==
Traditional ecological knowledge has had increase significance and usage in landscape restoration spheres. Using traditional ecological knowledge alongside Western ecological knowledge is becoming the more mainstream approach to landscape restoration, as many landscapes have evolved alongside humans over thousands of years, and because often times the ideal landscape used as the reference ecosystem is the pre-colonial ecological landscape.

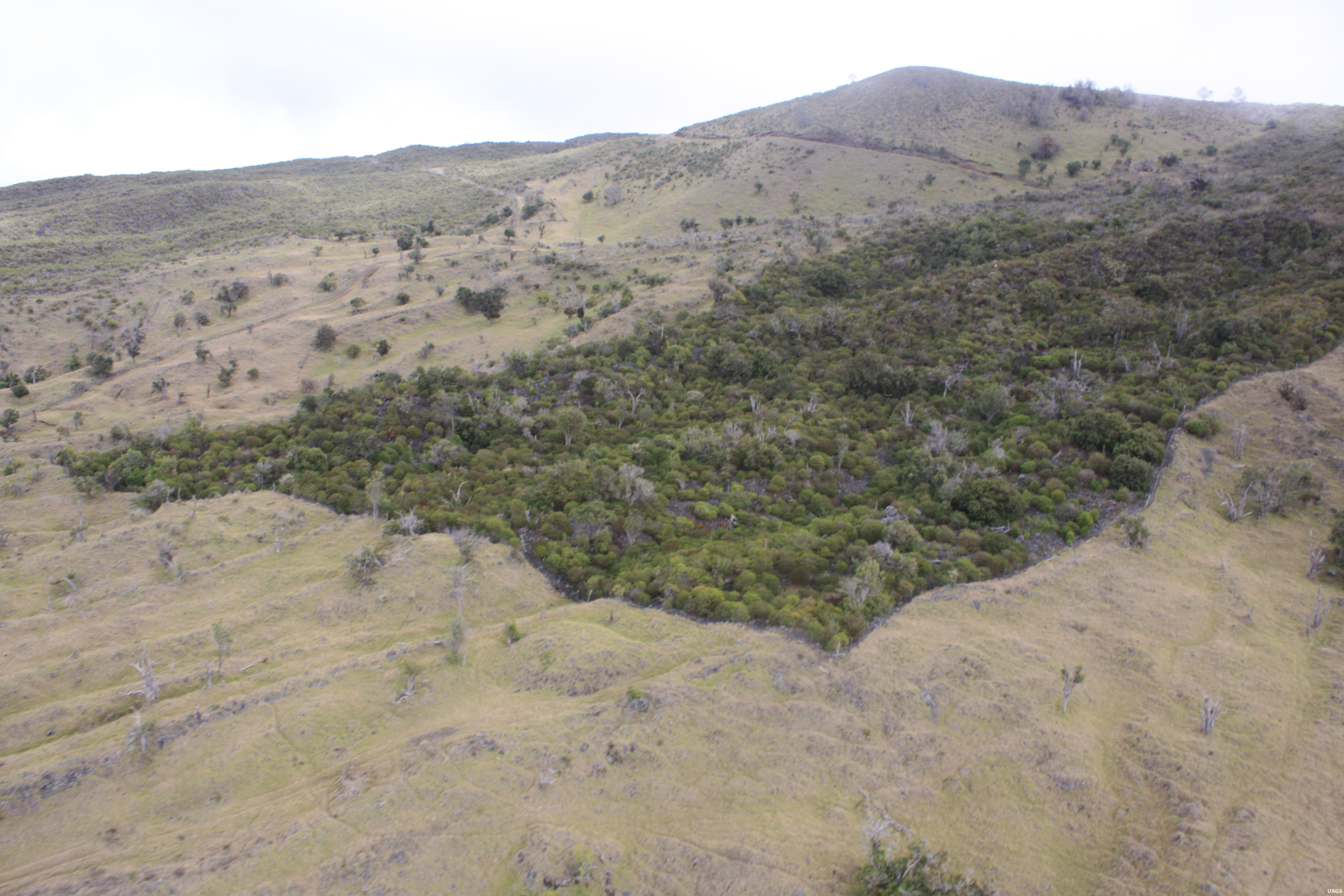
Auwahi Dryland Forest Restoration Project on the slopes of Hale'akala on the island of Maui, Hawaii, 2010

== Case study: countering desertification ==
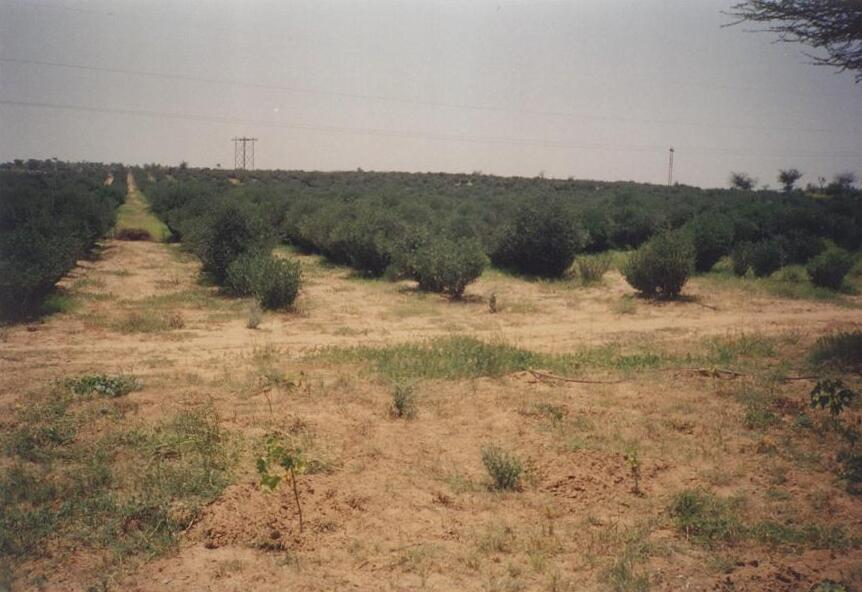
Jojoba (Simmondsia chinensis) plantations, such as those shown, have played a role in combating edge effects of desertification in the Thar Desert, India.

Land reclamation in deserts involves

- setting up reliable water provisioning (e.g. by digging wells or placing long-distance water pipes)
- stabilizing and fixating the soil

Stabilizing and fixating the soil is usually done in several phases.

The first phase is fixating the soil to such extent that dune movement is ceased. This is done by grasses, and plants providing wind protection such as shelterbelts, windbreaks and woodlots. Shelterbelts are wind protections composed of rows of trees, arranged perpendicular to the prevailing wind, while woodlots are more extensive areas of woodland.

The second phase involves improving/enriching the soil by planting nitrogen-fixating plants and using the soil immediately to grow crops. Nitrogen fixating plants used include clover, yellow mustard, beans, etc., and food crops include wheat, barley, beans, peas, sweet potatoes, date, olives, limes, figs, apricot, guava, tomato, certain herbs, etc. Regardless of the cover crop used, the crops (not including any trees) are each year harvested and/or plowed into the soil (e.g. with clover). In addition, each year the plots are used for another type of crop (known as crop rotation) to prevent depleting the soil on specific trace elements.

A recent development is the Seawater Greenhouse and Seawater Forest. This proposal is to construct these devices on coastal deserts in order to create fresh water and grow food. A similar approach is the Desert Rose concept. These approaches are of widespread applicability, since the relative costs of pumping large quantities of seawater inland are low.

Another related concept is ADRECS – a proposed system for rapidly delivering soil stabilisation and re-forestation techniques coupled with renewable energy generation.

== See also ==
- Land rehabilitation – Part of environmental remediation
- Environmental restoration – Scientific study of renewing and restoring ecosystems
- Reforestation – Method for land and forest regeneration, Forest restoration, Forest landscape restoration
- Restoration ecology – Scientific study of renewing and restoring ecosystems
- Farmer-managed natural regeneration – Technique to combat deforestation and desertification
- Floodplain restoration – Restoration of a river's floodplain
- Groundwater remediation – Process used to treat polluted groundwater
- Riparian-zone restoration – Ecological restoration of river banks and floodplains
- Stream restoration – Work to improve the environmental health of a river or stream
- Tree planting – Process of transplanting tree seedlings
- Bioremediation – Process used to treat contaminated media such as water and soil
- Daylighting (streams) – Restoring covered streams to more natural conditions
- Mine reclamation – Restoration of land after mineral extraction
- Soil salinity control – Controlling the problem of soil salinity, restoration of saline land
- Bonn Challenge – Global effort to restore the world's degraded and deforested lands
- Rewilding – Restoring of wilderness environments
- Passive rewilding – Previously inhabited areas reclaimed by vegetation and wildlife
- Urban reforestation – Planting of trees in urban environments
- Artificialization – Geology phenomenon
