= UN Decade on Ecosystem Restoration =

International decade, 2021–2030

The United Nations Decade on Ecosystem Restoration runs from 2021 to 2030. Similar to other nature-related international decades, its purpose is to promote the United Nations’ environmental goals. It is intended to facilitate global cooperation for the restoration of degraded and destroyed ecosystems, and to foster efforts to combat climate change, safeguard biodiversity, promote food security, and secure water supply. While much focus is on promoting restoration activity by national governments, the UN also wishes to promote such efforts from other actors, ranging from the private sector and NGOs to regular individuals.

Following on from the 2011–2020 United Nations Decade on Biodiversity, the decade on Ecosystem Restoration was launched in June 2021. The United Nations called for countries to follow through on existing pledges to restore a total area similar to the size of China by 2030. They also say the overarching goal of the decade is to catalyse a nature-friendly movement that lasts beyond the 10-year timeframe.

== Launch ==
The United Nations Decade on Ecosystem Restoration began on World Environment Day, 5 June 2021. In a June 2021 report to help launch the decade, the UN called for nations to deliver on existing ecosystem restoration commitments, which in total add up to over 1 billion hectares, an area bigger than China. About half the world's GDP is directly dependent on nature, yet mankind is depleting natural resources at about 1.6 times the rate at which nature can restore them. Already about 40% of the world's population suffers due to ecosystem depletion, with close to 20% of countries at risk of ecosystem collapse. The report advised that restoration efforts to address this could contribute about a third of the climate change mitigation needed by 2030, as well as protect nature and biodiversity, with significant benefits to humans in terms of physical health, mental health and economically.

The UN also called for additional efforts beyond the existing pledges, including for action to restore aquatic ecosystems, and for a lasting global movement to endure after 2030. The UN stated that while efforts from national governments are vital, everyone has a role to play, including the private sector, NGOs and individuals.

=== Ecosystem restoration ===
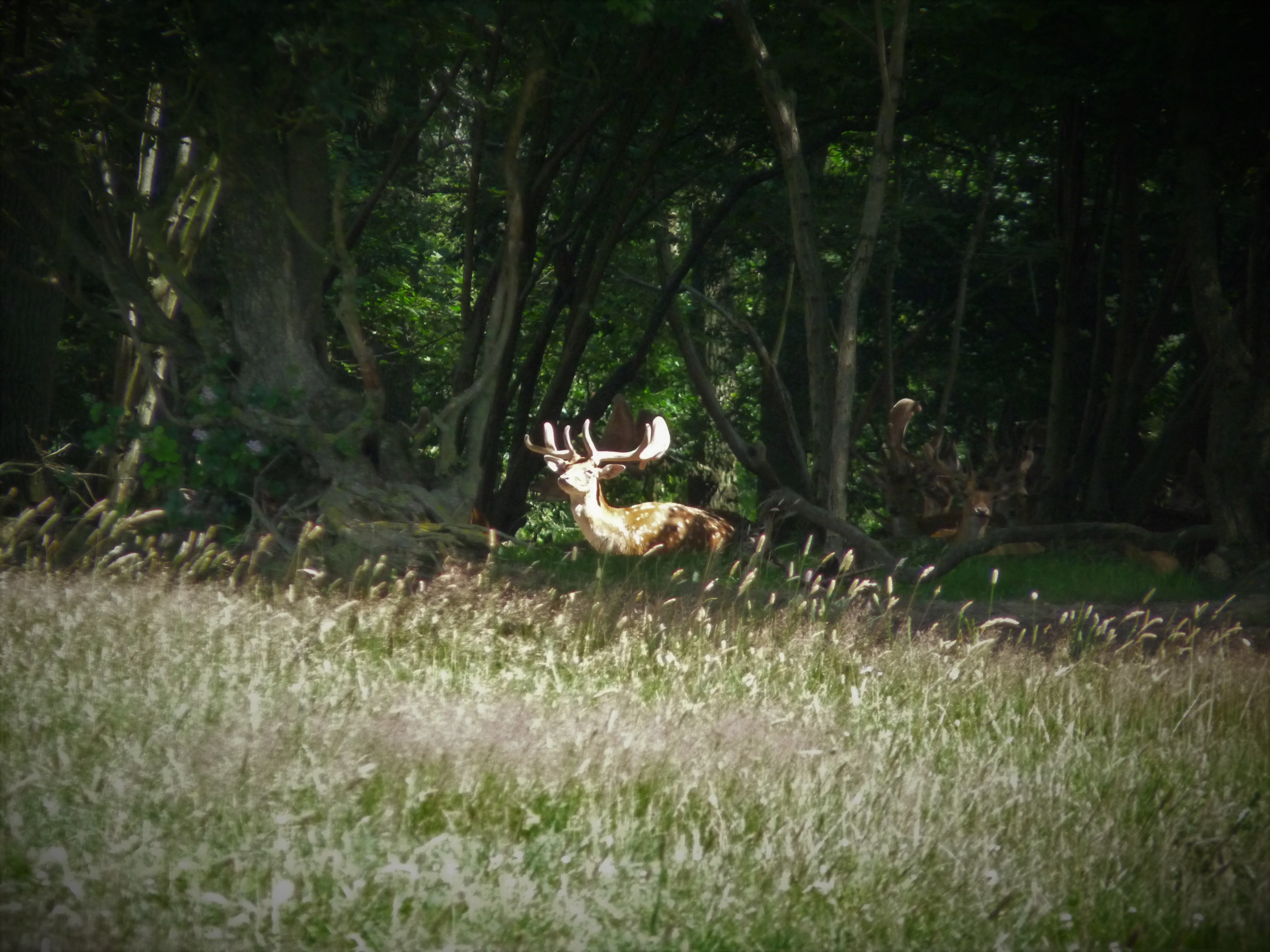
The Knepp Wildland rewilding initiative

The UN define ecosystem restoration as "the process of halting and reversing degradation, resulting in improved ecosystem services and recovered biodiversity". In practice, a particular restoration can involve quite different transitions, depending on what best suits the local conditions.

- An existing degraded natural ecosystem (e.g. a forest) might be restored to a healthy natural ecosystem, e.g. by removing pollutants or restoring key megafauna, such as deer.
- A degraded modified ecosystem (e.g. farmland) might be restored to a more functional modified ecosystems, perhaps by restoring hedgerows which can help improve soil quality.
- A degraded modified ecosystem could also undergo a more fundamental transformation, restoring it all the way to a fully natural ecosystem, though the UN caution this should only be done if it does not negatively impact local people who might depend on said modified ecosystem.

The UN advise that different approaches to ecosystem restoration are needed - what works well in one area might fail in another. Approaches they recommend include regenerative agriculture, ecological restoration and rewilding.

=== Key bodies and partners ===
The UN Decade on Ecosystem Restoration is co-led by two UN agencies – the United Nations Environment Programme (UNEP) and the Food and Agriculture Organization (FAO). Other key bodies involved are the Center for International Forestry Research (CIFOR), the International Union for Conservation of Nature (IUCN), and the Global Landscapes Forum (GLF). In supporting the UN Decade, they will partner with other UN agencies, bodies and convention secretariats, and with international and indigenous organisations.

== Pre-launch ==
=== Proclamation ===
During the Bonn Challenge 3.0 high-level meeting in March 2018, El Salvador announced plans to propose a United Nations Decade on Ecosystem Restoration 2021–2030, aimed at boosting existing efforts to restore degraded ecosystems. El Salvador's leadership on ecosystem restoration arose out of its support for the Bonn Challenge, which aims to restore 350 million hectares of degraded ecosystems globally by 2030, and endorsement of the New York Declaration on Forests. As one of the six Bonn Challenge pilot countries, El Salvador has pledged to restore 1 million hectares, equivalent to half of the country's territory.

Seventy-one countries supported the proposal at its presentation by El Salvador's Minister of Environment and Natural Resources, Lina Pohl, to the 73rd session of the United Nations General Assembly in September 2018. On 1 March 2019, the UN General Assembly officially adopted the resolution declaring 2021–2030 the UN Decade of Ecosystem Restoration.

According to Minister Pohl, "Ecosystem restoration promoted through this UN Decade takes a multi-functional landscape approach, looking at the mosaic of interdependent land uses in which ecological, economic, social, and development-based priorities can find convergence, balance, and complementarity."

=== Rationale ===
Pre-launch material suggested the United Nations Decade on Ecosystem Restoration would focus on balancing ecological, social and developmental priorities in landscapes where different forms of land use interact, with the aim of fostering long term resilience.

An ecosystem includes all living organisms, and their interaction with each other and their physical environment (such as soil, climate, atmosphere, and weather). Each organism plays a key role and contributes to the health and productivity of the ecosystem as a whole. Ecosystems are interdependent, and damage or imbalance can have devastating and far-reaching consequences. Biodiversity underlies all ecosystem services, which are the benefits that people obtain from ecosystems, indispensable to health, survival and wellbeing. They include provisioning services (food, freshwater, wood and fibre, and fuel), regulating services (modulating climate, disease, food supply, and water purity), and cultural services (serving aesthetic, spiritual, and educational needs).

Human activities are affecting the capacity of ecosystems to provide these goods and services. Drivers of biodiversity loss and decline in ecosystem functioning include climate change, deforestation, desertification and land degradation, freshwater decline, overexploitation, stratospheric ozone depletion, and pollution. Degradation of land and marine ecosystems adds to the threat of mass species extinction, and has a negative impact on the well-being of some 3.2 billion people, costing around 10% of the annual global gross domestic product (c. $6.3 trillion) in loss of species and ecosystem services. Agricultural land and ecosystem degradation reduces resilience to climate change, which enhances the risk of catastrophic collapse in the face of rising temperatures and changes in rainfall patterns. The benefits future generations can obtain from ecosystems will be greatly diminished unless these problems are addressed.

Ecosystem restoration seeks to repair damage done by people to ecosystems and biodiversity. It assists the recovery of degraded, damaged and destroyed ecosystems, to regain ecological functionality and provide goods and services of value to humans. The beneficial effects of ecosystem restoration include increased food and water security, contributing to climate change mitigation and adaptation, and managing the associated risks of conflict and migration. The restoration of 350 million hectares of degraded terrestrial and aquatic ecosystems by 2030 could generate US$9 trillion in ecosystem services and remove 13 to 26 gigatons of greenhouse gases from the atmosphere. The benefits obtained from ecosystem generation on average exceed the costs of the initial investment tenfold, whereas the cost of inaction is at least three times the cost of ecosystem restoration.

=== Opportunity and aims ===
Around 2 billion hectares of degraded lands worldwide have potential for ecosystem restoration. Most of the rehabilitation work could take the form of "mosaic restoration", in which forests are combined with protected areas, agriculture, waterbodies, and human settlements on a landscape-wide scale.

Transformational ecosystem restoration requires strong commitment, and the efforts of countries, the international community, civil society, the private sector, and other actors. Achieving the Bonn Challenge objective of restoring at least 350 million hectares of degraded landscapes by 2030 could realize up to $9 trillion in net benefits, and alleviate poverty in many rural communities. The UN Decade aims to promote a concerted and holistic landscape-focused approach to the interdependence of ecosystems, human needs, and biodiversity, to accelerate the progress needed to maintain and restore ecosystems.

The UN Decade on Ecosystem Restoration was established in order to:

- Build a common vision, prioritizing ecosystem restoration from the global to the local level to accelerate reversal of ecosystem degradation
- Mainstream ecosystem restoration in policy and planning to address current developmental challenges due to land degradation, biodiversity loss, and climate change vulnerability
- Foster a holistic approach to achieving international commitments and national priorities through ecosystem and landscape restoration
- Enhance cooperation and resource mobilization to increase the flow of financial resources, technologies, knowledge, and capacity building to countries and jurisdictions working to meet national goals and international commitments, including the Sustainable Development Goals, through ecosystem restoration
- Encourage partnerships and investments, promoting a resilient economy by increasing support for smallholders' generation of value from land use products and potential to contribute to ecosystem restoration
- Promote cooperation between funds providers, governments, civil society, and the private sector to help overcome barriers to scaling up resource-efficient productive systems in association with ecosystem restoration
- Raise awareness of the importance of functional ecosystems for human well-being and productive activities, local development and the economic sustainability of society

=== Links to other initiatives ===
Ecosystem restoration is recognized as a key component in achieving targets under existing international conventions and agreements. These include the 2030 Agenda for Sustainable Development and, under it, the Sustainable Development Goals (SDGs), the Strategic Plan for Biodiversity 2020 and its Aichi Biodiversity Targets, the United Nations Framework Convention on Climate Change and Paris Agreement, the United Nations Convention to Combat Desertification and its target of Land Degradation Neutrality, the Ramsar Convention, and the United Nations Strategic Plan on Forests 2017 – 2030.

Ecosystem restoration will contribute to all 17 Sustainable Development Goals, in particular to SDG15 (Life on Land), SDG 2 (Zero Hunger), SDG 6 (Clean Water and Sanitation), SDG 7 (Affordable and Clean Energy), SDG 12 (Responsible Consumption and Production), SDG 13 (Climate Action), SDG 14 (Life Below Water) and SDG 17 (Partnerships for the Goals). Paragraph 27 of the Ministerial Declaration of the High-Level Political Forum on the SDGs held in July 2018 sets out commitments made to achieve sustainable management of all types of forests, halt deforestation, restore degraded forests, and substantially increase afforestation and reforestation globally by 2020.

Planned activities during the UN Decade on Ecosystem Restoration are also designed to contribute to the Bonn Challenge to restore degraded and deforested land. The UN Decade builds on regional restoration efforts, such as Initiative 20x20 in Latin America, which aims to restore 20 million hectares of degraded land by 2030; and the AFR100 African Forest Landscape Restoration Initiative, that aims to bring 100 million hectares of degraded land under restoration by 2030.

=== Ecosystem restoration resolutions ===
Resolutions relevant to ecosystem restoration adopted during past UN Environment Assemblies (UNEA) of the United Nations Environment Program (UNEP) include:

- UNEP/EA.1/L.08 Ecosystem-based adaptation
- UNEP/EA.2/L.24 Combating desertification, land degradation and drought and promoting sustainable pastoralism and rangelands
- UNEP/EA.3/L.10 Addressing water pollution to protect and restore water-related ecosystems

The following resolutions adopted during the fourth UNEA, from 11 to 15 March 2019, highlight the importance of ecosystem restoration:

- UNEP/EA.4/L.11 Innovations on biodiversity and land degradation
- UNEP/EA.4/L.19 Conservation and Sustainable Management of Peatlands
- UNEP/EA.4/L.14 Sustainable coral reefs management
- UNEP/EA.4/L.13 Sustainable Management for Global Health of Mangrove
