= Reforestation =

Method for land and forest regeneration

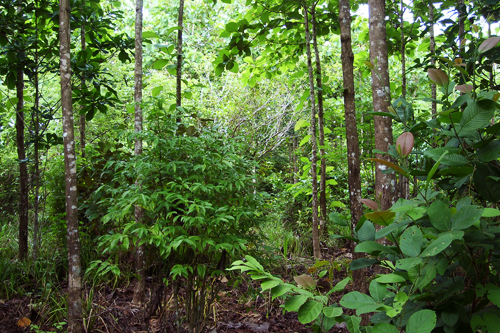
A forest, six years after reforestation efforts in Panama.

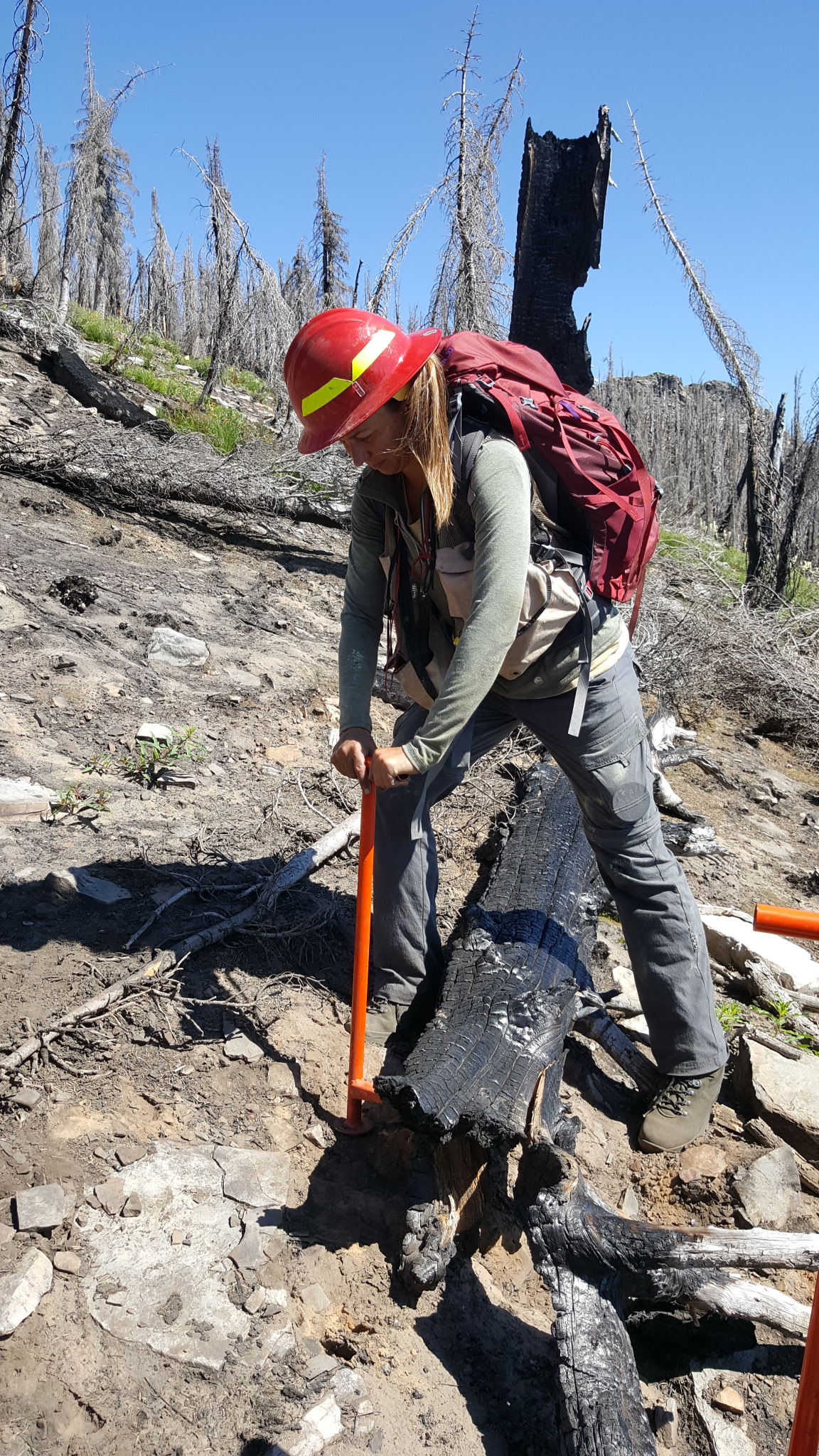
Reforestation in progress: Direct-sowing of seed in a burned area (after a wildfire) in the Idaho Panhandle National Forest, United States.

Reforestation is the practice of restoring previously existing forests and woodlands that have been destroyed or damaged. The prior forest destruction might have happened through deforestation, clearcutting or wildfires. Three important purposes of reforestation programs are for harvesting of wood, for climate change mitigation, and for ecosystem and habitat restoration purposes. One method of reforestation is to establish tree plantations, also called plantation forests. They cover about 131 million ha worldwide, which is 3% of the global forest area and 45% of the total area of planted forests.

Globally, planted forests increased from 4.1% to 7.0% of the total forest area between 1990 and 2015. Plantation forests made up 280 million ha (hectare) in 2015, an increase of about 40 million ha in the previous ten years. Of the planted forests worldwide, 18% of that area consists of exotic or introduced species while the rest consist of species native to the country where they are planted.

There are limitations and challenges with reforestation projects, especially if they are in the form of tree plantations. Firstly, there can be competition with other land uses and displacement risk. Secondly, tree plantations are often monocultures which comes with a set of disadvantages, for example biodiversity loss. Lastly, there is also the problem that stored carbon is released at some point.

The effects of reforestation will be farther in the future than those of proforestation (the conservation of intact forests). Instead of planting entirely new areas, it might be better to reconnect forested areas and restore the edges of forest. This protects their mature core and makes them more resilient and longer-lasting. It takes much longer − several decades − for the carbon sequestration benefits of reforestation to become similar to those from mature trees in tropical forests. Therefore, reducing deforestation is usually more beneficial for climate change mitigation than is reforestation.

Many countries carry out reforestation programs. For example, in China, the Three Northern Protected Forest Development Program – informally known as the "Great Green Wall" – was launched in 1978 and scheduled to last until 2050. It aims to eventually plant nearly 90 million acres of new forest in a 2,800-mile stretch of northern China. Such programs often blur the boundaries between reforestation and afforestation (the latter being the establishment of a forest in an area where there was no forest before).

== Definition ==
Reforestation, according to the IPCC means the "conversion to forest of land that has previously contained forests but that has been converted to some other use".

According to FAO terminology, reforestation is defined as the re-establishment of forest through planting and/or deliberate seeding on land classified as forest.

Afforestation on the other hand means establishing new forest on lands that were not forest before (for example, abandoned agriculture). It is the process of restoring and recreating areas of woodlands or forests that may have existed long ago but were deforested or otherwise removed at some point in the past or lacked it naturally (for example, natural grasslands).

== Purposes ==
=== Harvesting of wood ===
Reforestation is not solely used for recovery of accidentally destroyed forests. In some countries, such as Finland, many forests are managed by the wood products and pulp and paper industry. In such arrangements, trees are planted to replace those that have been cut, much like other crops. The Finnish Forest Act from 1996 requires that forest be replanted after felling. In such circumstances, the industry can cut the trees in a way to allow easier reforestation.

Reforestation, if several indigenous species are used, can provide other benefits in addition to financial returns, including restoration of the soil, rejuvenation of local flora and fauna, and the capturing and sequestering of 38 tons of carbon dioxide per hectare per year.

=== Climate change mitigation ===
There are four primary ways in which reforestation and reducing deforestation can increase carbon sequestration and thus help with climate change mitigation. First, by increasing the volume of existing forest. Second, by increasing the carbon density of existing forests at a stand and landscape scale. Third, by expanding the use of forest products that will sustainably replace fossil-fuel emissions. Fourth, by reducing carbon emissions that are caused from deforestation and degradation.

Proportion of carbon stock in forest carbon pools, 2020

Total forest carbon stock, by carbon pool, 2025.

Forests are an important part of the global carbon cycle because trees and plants absorb carbon dioxide through photosynthesis. Therefore, they play an important role in climate change mitigation. By removing the greenhouse gas CO_{2} from the air, forests function as terrestrial carbon sinks, meaning they store large amounts of carbon in the form of biomass, encompassing roots, stems, branches, and leaves. By doing so, forests sequester approximately 25% of human carbon emissions annually, playing a critical role in Earth's climate. Throughout their lifespan, trees continue to sequester carbon, storing atmospheric CO_{2} long-term. Sustainable forest management, afforestation, reforestation are therefore important contributions to climate change mitigation.

An important consideration in such efforts is that forests can turn from sinks to carbon sources. In 2019 forests took up a third less carbon than they did in the 1990s, due to higher temperatures, droughts and deforestation. National-scale forest inventory data also shows trends from 1999 to 2020 that some forests were already approaching climate thresholds shifting them from carbon sinks to carbon sources. The typical tropical forest may become a carbon source by the 2060s.

Researchers have found that, in terms of environmental services, it is better to avoid deforestation than to allow for deforestation to subsequently reforest, as the latter leads to irreversible effects in terms of biodiversity loss and soil degradation. Furthermore, the probability that legacy carbon will be released from soil is higher in a younger boreal forest. In particular, boreal forests have been noted to support the growth of Armillaria (honey fungus), which is a root pathogen that breaks down compounds necessary for wood integrity, increasing the likelihood of carbon release. Global greenhouse gas emissions caused by damage to tropical rainforests may have been substantially underestimated until around 2019. Additionally, the effects of afforestation and reforestation will be farther in the future than keeping existing forests intact. It takes much longer − several decades − for the benefits for global warming to manifest to the same carbon sequestration benefits from mature trees in tropical forests and hence from limiting deforestation. Therefore, scientists consider "the protection and recovery of carbon-rich and long-lived ecosystems, especially natural forests" to be "the major climate solution".

The planting of trees on marginal crop and pasture lands helps to incorporate carbon from atmospheric CO_{2} into biomass. For this carbon sequestration process to succeed the carbon must not return to the atmosphere from biomass burning or rotting when the trees die. Several species of Ficus such as Ficus wakefieldii have been observed to sequester atmospheric CO_{2} as calcium oxalate in the presence of oxalotrophic bacteria and fungi, which catabolize the oxalate, which produces calcium carbonate. The calcium carbonate is precipitated throughout the tree, which also alkalinizes the surrounding soil. These species are current candidates for carbon sequestration in agroforestry. Another example for an oxalogene tree is Brosimum alicastrum. This Calcium-oxalate fixation process was first observed in the Iroko tree, which can sequester up to a ton of calcium carbonate in the soil over its lifespan. Also Cacti, such as the Saguaro, transfer carbon from the biological cycle to the geological cycle by forming the mineral calcium carbonate.

=== Ecosystem restoration ===
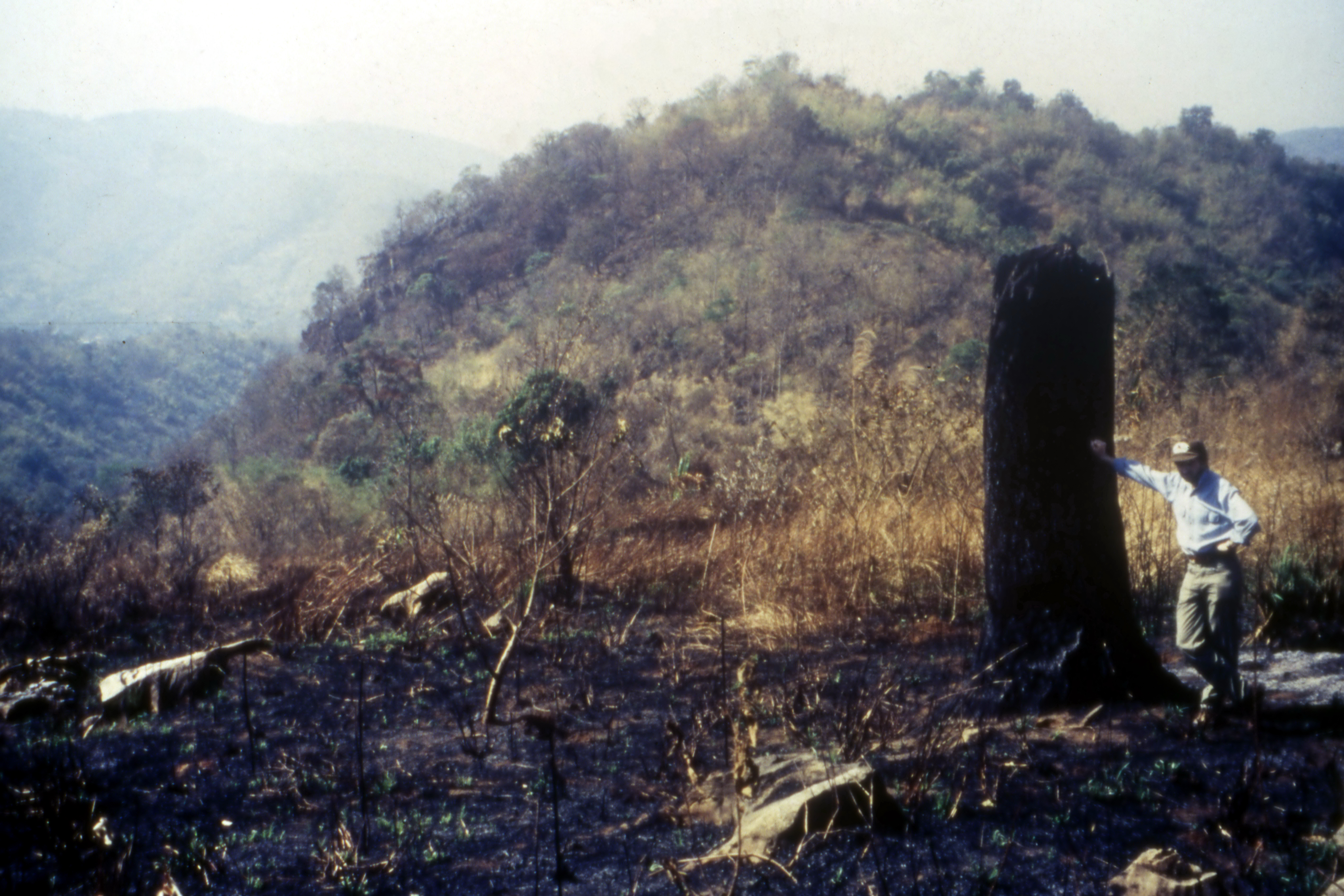
Degraded land ready for restoration

Plantation forests are intensively managed, composed of one or two species, even-aged, planted with regular spacing, and established mainly for productive purposes. Other planted forests, which comprise 55 percent of all planted forests, are not intensively managed, and they may resemble natural forests at stand maturity. The purposes of other planted forests may include ecosystem restoration and the protection of soil and water values.

== Methods ==
=== Forest plantations ===
Plantation forests cover about 131 million ha, which is 3 percent of the global forest area and 45 percent of the total area of planted forests.

Over 90% of the world's forests regenerate organically, and more than half are covered by forest management plans or equivalents.

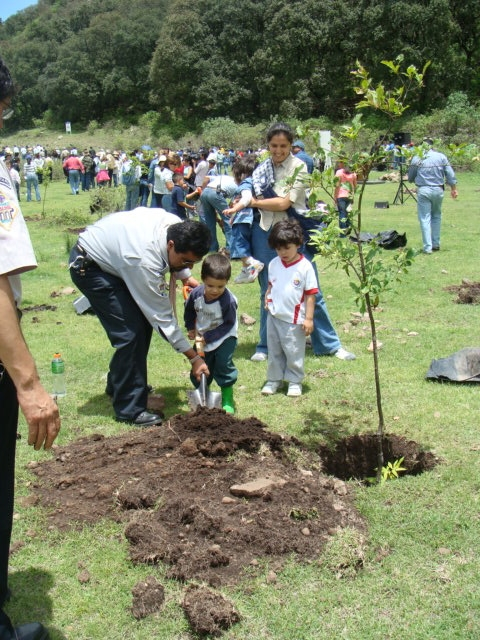
Forest restoration project in Mexico

Globally, planted forests increased from 4.1% to 7.0% of the total forest area between 1990 and 2015. Plantation forests made up 280 million ha (hectare) in 2015, an increase of about 40 million ha in the previous ten years. Of the planted forests worldwide, 18% of that planted area consists of exotic or introduced species while the rest consist of species native to the country where they are planted.

A tree plantation, forest plantation, plantation forest, timber plantation, or tree farm is a forest planted for high volume production of wood, usually by planting one type of tree as a monoculture forest. The term tree farm also is used to refer to tree nurseries and Christmas tree farms. Plantation forestry can produce a high volume of wood in a short period of time. Plantations are grown by state forestry authorities (for example, the Forestry Commission in Britain) and/or the paper and wood industries and other private landowners (such as Weyerhaeuser, Rayonier, and Sierra Pacific Industries in the United States or Asia Pulp & Paper in Indonesia). Christmas trees are often grown on plantations, and in southern and southeastern Asia, teak plantations have replaced the natural forest. Industrial plantations are actively managed for the commercial production of forest products. Industrial plantations are usually large-scale. Individual blocks are usually even-aged and often consist of just one or two species. These species can be exotic or indigenous. The plants used for the plantation are often genetically altered for desired traits such as growth and resistance to pests and diseases in general and specific traits, for example in the case of timber species, volumic wood production and stem straightness. Forest genetic resources are the basis for genetic alteration. Selected individuals grown in seed orchards are a good source for seeds to develop adequate planting material.

Wood production on a tree plantation is generally higher than that of natural forests. While forests managed for wood production commonly yield between 1 and 3 cubic meters per hectare per year, plantations of fast-growing species commonly yield between 20 and 30 cubic meters or more per hectare annually; a grand fir plantation in Scotland has a growth rate of 34 cubic meters per hectare per year, and Monterey pine plantations in southern Australia can yield up to 40 cubic meters per hectare per year. In 2000, while plantations accounted for 5% of global forest, it is estimated that they supplied about 35% of the world's roundwood.

==== Using existing trees and roots ====
Planting new trees often leads to up to 90% of seedlings failing. However, even in deforested areas, existing root systems often exist. Growth can be accelerated by pruning and coppicing where a few branches of new shoots are cut and often used for charcoal, itself a major driver of deforestation. Since new seeds are not planted, it is cheaper. Additionally, they are much more likely to survive as their root systems already exist and can tap into groundwater during harsher seasons with no rain. While this method has existed for centuries, it is now sometimes referred to as farmer-managed natural regeneration or assisted natural regeneration.

== Financial incentives ==
Policies that promote reforestation for incentives in return have shown promising results of being an effective and motivative concept to re-plant globally on a mass scale.

Some incentives for reforestation can be as simple as a financial compensation. A compensated reduction of deforestation approach has been proposed which would reward developing countries that disrupt any further act of deforestation: Countries that participate and take the option to reduce their emissions from deforestation during a committed period of time would receive financial compensation for the carbon dioxide emissions that they avoided. To raise the payments, the host country would issue government bonds or negotiate some kind of loan with a financial institution that would want to take part in the compensation promised to the other country. The funds received by the country could be invested to help find alternatives to the extensive cutdown of forests. This whole process of cutting emissions would be voluntary, but once the country has agreed to lower their emissions they would be obligated to reduce their emissions. However, if a country was not able to meet their obligation, their target would get added to their next commitment period. The authors of these proposals see this as a solely government-to-government agreement; private entities would not participate in the compensation trades.

Another emerging revenue source to fund reforestation projects deals with the sale of carbon sequestration credits, which can be sold to companies and individuals looking to compensate their carbon footprint. This approach allows for private landowners and farmers to gain a revenue from the reforestation of their lands, while simultaneously benefiting from improved soil health and increased productivity.

Alongside past financial incentive strategies, reforestation tax benefits have been another way the government has encouraged companies to promote reforestation tactics through the promises of a tax break.

As many landholders seek to earn carbon credits through sequestration, their participation also encourages biodiversity and provides ecosystem services for crops and livestock.

== Challenges ==
There is often insufficient integration between the different purposes of reforestation, namely economic utilization, enhancement of biodiversity and carbon sequestration. This can lead to a range of different challenges.

=== Competition with other land uses and displacement risk ===
Reforestation can compete with other land uses, such as food production, livestock grazing, and living space, for further economic growth. Reforestation can also divert large amounts of water from other activities. A map created by the World Resources Institute in collaboration with the IUCN identifies 2 billion hectares for potential forest restoration and is criticized for including 900 million hectares of grasslands. An assessment of the pledges of governments for reforestation found that the sum of global pledges translates to a required land area of 1.2bn hectares, until 2060, which is equal to a tenth of the global land area und thus deemed unrealistic without a significant encroachment on non-forest areas. Experts are calling for a better integration of social data, such as the dependence of livelihoods on specific land uses, into restoration efforts. Possible solutions include the integration of other land uses into forests through agroforestry, such as growing coffee plants under trees, reducing the delineation between forests and other land uses.

A study found that almost 300 million people live on tropical forest restoration opportunity land in the Global South, constituting a large share of low-income countries' populations, and argues for prioritized inclusion of "local communities" in forest restoration projects.

There are calls for a more selective approach to identifying reforestation areas, taking into account the possible displacement of customary land uses.

=== Political and economic challenges ===
Reforestation is shaped by political decisions made at different levels such as local, national and international. Most countries rely on government programs and financial funding to support their reforestation ideas or projects. At the international level, reforestation is promoted as global climate agreements, where countries count forests that are restored toward their climate commitments. Reforestation policies also can lead to political tension when restoration efforts compete with agriculture, or land use needs. Some reforestation programs have attempted the idea of focusing more on carbon storage rather than the needs of nearby communities, and have been criticized for this. These ideas and programs have brought questions about who actually benefits from most of these policies. Recent cuts or freezes in international funding have also caused major political issues such as slowing down or disrupting reforestation and restoration projects. All of these issues show how reforestation is connected to economics, government decisions and policies, and other types of politics.

=== Biodiversity loss ===
Reforesting sometimes results in extensive canopy creation that prevents growth of diverse vegetation in the shadowed areas and generating soil conditions that hamper other types of vegetation. Trees used in some reforesting efforts (for example, Eucalyptus globulus) tend to extract large amounts of moisture from the soil, preventing the growth of other plants. The European Commission found that, in terms of environmental services, it is better to avoid deforestation than to allow for deforestation to subsequently reforest, as the former leads to irreversible effects in terms of biodiversity loss and soil degradation.

The effects reforestation has on biodiversity is not limited to just other forms of vegetation, it can affect all forms of living organisms all contained in the present ecosystem. Due to the major role trees have on ecosystems it is important to better understand components like the ecosystem, waterways, and species present in areas that are being re-planted. Prior research helps limit the depletion of biodiversity which can hinder medicinal discoveries, and alter gene flow in organisms.

A debated issue in managed reforestation is whether the succeeding forest will have the same biodiversity as the original forest. If the forest is replaced with only one species of tree and all other vegetation is prevented from growing back, a monoculture forest similar to agricultural crops would be the result. However, most reforestation involves the planting of different selections of seedlings taken from the area, often of multiple species.

=== Stored carbon being released ===
There is also the risk that, through a forest fire or insect outbreak, much of the stored carbon in a reforested area could make its way back to the atmosphere. Furthermore, the probability that legacy carbon will be released from soil is higher in younger boreal forests. An example of this can be seen in the peatlands in Central Africa, which house an abundance of carbon in the mud called peat. Much like the forest fire or insect outbreak which can harm tropical rainforests, money can also be seen an incentive to harm forests and be paid off to protect it. The global greenhouse gas emissions caused by damage to tropical rainforests may be underestimated by a factor of six.

Also, the possible harvesting and utilization of wood from reforested areas, limits the permanence of carbon sequestered through reforestation. For example, it was found that nearly half of the pledges under the Bonn Challenge were areas earmarked for commercial wood use.

Additionally, the effects of afforestation and reforestation will be farther in the future than those of proforestation (the conservation of intact forests). It takes much longer − several decades − for the benefits for global warming to manifest to the same carbon sequestration benefits from mature trees in tropical forests and hence from limiting deforestation.

As of 2019, some researchers noted that instead of planting entirely new areas, reconnecting forested areas and restoring the edges of forest, to protect their mature core and make them more resilient and longer-lasting, should be prioritized.

=== Implementation challenges ===
There are some implementation challenges:

- Seed shortage: the Seed to Forest Alliance was founded in 2022, in response to a global seed shortage. It will promote the establishment of national seed banks, while focusing on the tropics and biodiversity hotspots.
- Seedling survival rate: a common challenge for reforestation is the low survival rate of seedlings. Planted trees often do not mature, for example due to difficult climatic conditions or insufficient care after planting.

== By country ==
=== Asia ===
==== China ====
Prior to the founding of the PRC, the country's forest cover had been reduced to 5-8%. The forest coverage of the country grew from 10% of the overall territory in 1949 to 25% in 2024.

China has introduced the Green Wall of China project, which aims to halt the expansion of the Gobi desert through the planting of trees. There has been a 47-million-hectare increase in forest area in China since the 1970s. The total number of trees amounted to be about 35 billion and 4.55% of China's land mass increased in forest coverage. The forest coverage was 12% in the early 1980s and had reached 16.55% by 2001.

China announced two large reforestation programs, the Natural Forest Protection Program and the Returning Farmland to Forest program, in late 1998. The programs were piloted in Sichuan, Shaanxi, and Gansu in 1999. They became widely implemented in 2000. The Natural Forest Protection Program called for major reductions in timber harvest, forest conservation, and instituted logging bans in most of Sichuan, Yunnan, Guizhou, and Tibet. The program provided for alternative employment opportunities for former logging industry workers, including hiring them for reforestation work. The Returning Farmland to Forest program paid farmers to plant trees on less productive farmland and provided them with a yearly subsidy for lost income. In 2015 China announced a plan to plant 26 billion trees by the year 2025; that is, two trees for every Chinese citizen per year.

Between 2013 and 2018, China planted 338,000 square kilometres of forests, at a cost of $82.88 billion. By 2018, 21.7% of China's territory was covered by forests, a figure the government wants to increase to 26% by 2035. The total area of China is 9,596,961 square kilometres (see China), so 412,669 square kilometres more needs to be planted. According to the government's plan, by 2050, 30% of China's territory should be covered by forests.

In 2017, the Saihanba Afforestation Community won the UN Champions of the Earth Award in the Inspiration and Action category for their successful reforestation efforts, which began upon discovering the survival of a single tree.

From 2016 to 2021, 3976 square kilometers of forests were planted in the Tibet Autonomous Region, with plans for 20 million trees to be planted before 2023.

In the years 2012–2022, China restored more than 70 million hectares (700,000 km^{2}) of forests. China committed to plant and conserve 70 billion trees by the year 2030 as part of the Trillion Tree Campaign.

The Jane Goodall Institute launched the Million Tree Project in Kulun Qi, Inner Mongolia to plant one million trees. China used 24 million hectares of new forest to offset 21% of Chinese fossil fuel emissions in 2000.

The Chinese government requires mining companies to restore the environment around exhausted mines by refilling excavated pits and planting crops or trees. Many mining companies use these recovered mines for ecotourism business.

Launched in 1978 and scheduled to last until 2050, the Three Northern Protected Forest Development Program – informally known as the "Great Green Wall" – aims to eventually plant nearly 90 million acres of new forest in a 2,800-mile stretch of northern China.

Over 69.3 million hectares of forest were planted across China from 1999 to 2013. This large-scale reforestation contributed to China's forests sequestering 1.11 ± 0.38 Gt carbon per yr over the period 2010 to 2016. This amounted to about 45 percent of the yearly greenhouse gas emissions during that period in China.

==== India ====
Jadav Payeng had received national awards for reforestation efforts, known as the "Molai forest". He planted 1400 hectares of forest on the bank of river Brahmaputra alone. There are active reforestation efforts throughout the country. In 2016, India had more than 50 million trees planted in Uttar Pradesh and in 2017, more than 66 million trees planted in Madhya Pradesh. In addition to this and individual efforts, there are startup companies, such as Afforest, that are being created over the country working on reforestation. Lots of plantation are being carried out in the Indian continent but the survivability is very poor especially for massive plantations, with less than 20% survivability rate. To improve the forest cover and to achieve the national mission of forest cover of 33%, there is a need to improve the methods of plantation. Rather than mass planting, there is a need to work on performance measurement & tracking of trees growth. Taking this into consideration, a non-profit organization Ek Kadam Sansthan in Jaipur is leading the development of a module of mass tracking for plantations. The pilot has been done successfully and the organization is hoping to implement nationwide by the end of 2021.

==== Japan ====
The Ministry of Agriculture, Forestry and Fishery explain that about two-thirds of Japanese land is covered with forests, and it was almost unchanged from 1966 to 2012. Japan needs to reduce 26% of greenhouse gas emission from 2013 by 2030 to accomplish Paris Agreement and is trying to reduce 2% of them by forestry.

Mass environmental and human-body pollution along with related deforestation, water pollution, smoke damage, and loss of soils caused by mining operations in Ashio, Tochigi became the first environmental social issue in Japan. Efforts by Shōzō Tanaka had grown to large campaigns against the copper operation. This led to the creation of 'Watarase Yusuichi Pond', to settle the pollution which is a Ramsar site today. Reforestation was conducted as a part of afforestation due to inabilities of self-recovering by the natural land itself due to serious soil pollution and loss of woods consequence in loss of soils for plants to grow, thus needing artificial efforts involving introducing of healthy soils from outside. Starting from around 1897, about 50% of once bald mountains are now back to green.

==== Pakistan ====
The Billion Tree Tsunami was launched in 2014 by planting 10 billion trees, by the provincial government of Khyber Pakhtunkhwa (KPK) and Imran Khan, as a response to the challenge of global warming. Pakistan's Billion Tree Tsunami restored 350,000 hectares of forests and degraded land to surpass its Bonn Challenge commitment.

In 2018, Pakistan's prime minister Imran Khan declared that the country will plant 10 billion trees in the next five years.

In 2020, the Pakistani government launched an initiative to hire 63,600 laborers to plant trees in the northern Punjab region, with indigenous species such as acacia, mulberry and moringa. This initiative was meant to alleviate unemployment caused by lockdowns to mitigate the spread of COVID-19.

==== Philippines ====
In 2011, the Philippines established the National Greening Program as a priority program to help reduce poverty, promote food security, environmental stability, and biodiversity conservation, as well as enhance climate change mitigation and adaptation in the country. The program paved the way for the planting of almost 1.4 billion seedlings in about 1.66 million hectares nationwide during the 2011–2016 period. The Food and Agriculture Organization of the United Nations ranked the Philippines fifth among countries reporting the greatest annual forest area gain, which reached 240,000 hectares during the 2010–2015 period.

==== Thailand ====
Efforts are being made in Thailand to restore the land after 800,000 hectares of forest have been destroyed in exchange for cash crop land to grow maize. Agroforestry has become part of the solution to fix the damage caused by deforestation. Agroforestry would affect the agriculture and atmosphere in Thailand in numerous ways. By planting a combination of different tree species, these trees are able to change the microclimatic conditions. Nutrient cycling also occurs when trees are incorporated in the agricultural system. It is also probable that the soil erosion that occurred as a result of deforestation can be mediated when these trees are planted.

=== Europe ===
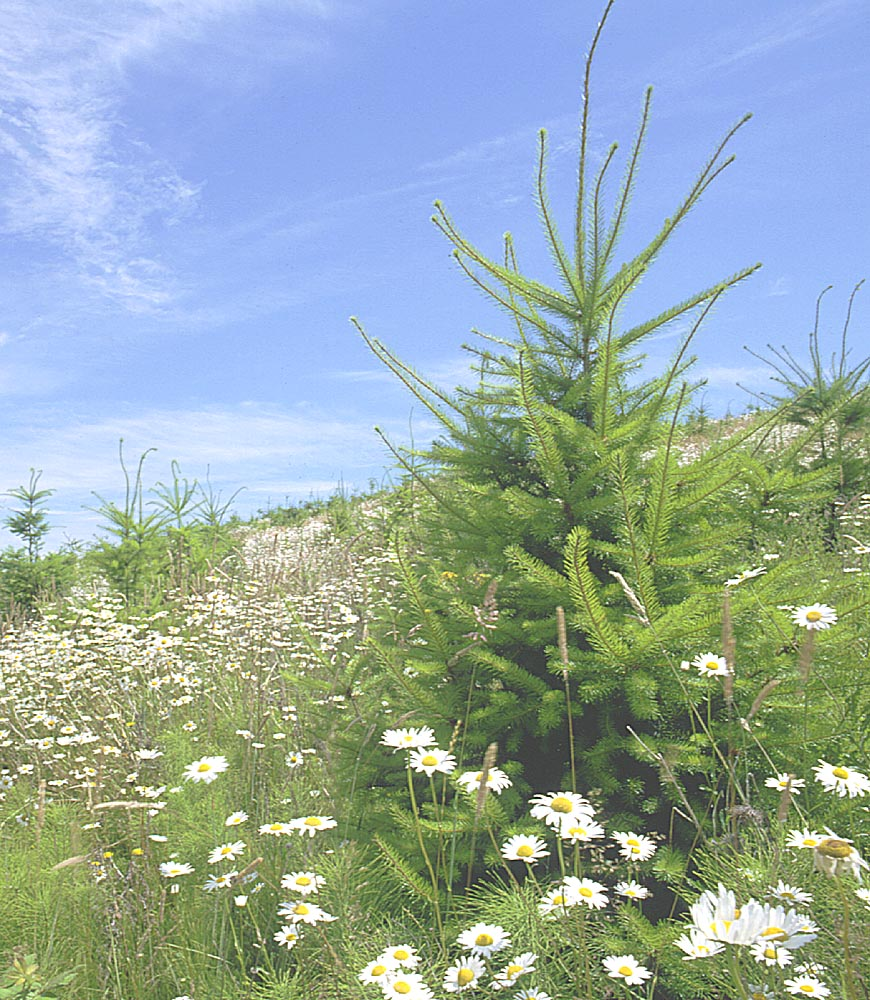
A 15-year-old reforested plot of land

==== Armenia ====
The Armenia Tree Project was founded in 1994 to address environmental and economic concerns related to Armenia's dwindling forests. Since its founding, the organization has planted more than 6.5 million trees in communities throughout Armenia.

My Forest Armenia was founded in 2019 and has since planted 910,000 trees in Armenia.

==== Croatia ====
In 2018, the Croatian volunteer group Boranka was formed to combat the loss of Croatian forestry due to deforestation and natural disasters. As of 2025, the group has planted over 130,000 saplings throughout the Dalmatia region, particularly in areas affected by fires and earthquakes.

In 2024, the volunteer reforestation project "CO2MPENSATING BY PLANTING", formed by the Croatian Scouts Association, Croatian Forests, and the HEARTH Agency, partnered with local volunteers in Slunj to plant over 4,000 native trees to combat damage done to the area's coniferous forests due to climate change.

==== Iceland ====
Prior to the deforestation of Iceland in the Middle Ages, some 40% of the land was forested. Today, the country is about 2% forested, with the Icelandic Forest Service aiming to increase that share to 10% through reforestation and natural regrowth.

==== Ireland ====
In 2019, the government of Ireland decided to plant 440 million trees by 2040. The decision is part of the government's plan to make Ireland carbon neutral by 2050 with renewable energy, land use change and carbon tax.

Ireland is also driven to increase sustainable timber consumption while also adding more eco-friendly work positions. They also have taken efforts to limit the use of methane emissions by signing a pledge to draw back methane use by 30%.

==== Germany ====
By the 14th century, forests in heavily populated areas had been devastated by industry, many of which required wood for their activities. Peter Stromer (1310–1388), lord of the Stromer trading and commercial company, was spurred by this shortage to "conduct forest culture experiments". In 1368 he successfully sowed fir and pine seeds in the Nuremberg Reichswald, which over time ended the wood shortage and established the "triumph of the pine in the Nuremberg Reichswald" (at the expense of other deciduous trees). The "doctrine of coniferous sowing" spread widely through forestry regulations and other writing at the time.

Reforestation is required as part of the federal forest law. 31% of Germany is forested, according to the second forest inventory of 2001–2003. The size of the forest area in Germany increased between the first and the second forest inventory due to forestation of degenerated bogs and agricultural areas.

==== United Kingdom ====
Since the 1980s, 8.5 million trees have been planted in the United Kingdom in an area of the Midlands around the villages of Moira and Donisthorpe, close to Leicester. The area is called The National Forest. An even larger reforestation project, called The Northern Forest, is beginning in South Yorkshire. It aims to plant 50 million trees. Despite this, the UK government has been criticized for not achieving its tree planting goals. There have also been concerns of non-native tree planting disturbing the ecological integrity and processes of what would be a native habitat restoration.

=== Middle East ===
==== Israel ====
Since 1948, large reforestation and afforestation projects were accomplished in Israel. 240 million trees have been planted. The carbon sequestration rate in these forests is similar to the European temperate forests.

Israel and only one other country was documented to have a net increase of forestation in the 2000s. This type of progress could be attributed to the social practices that Israel incorporates into their society.

==== Lebanon ====
For thousands of years Lebanon was covered by forests; one particular species of interest, Cedrus libani was exceptionally valuable and was almost eliminated due to lumbering operations. Many ancient cultures along the Mediterranean Sea harvested these trees including the Phoenicians who used cedar, pine and juniper for boat building, the Romans, who cut them down for lime-burning kilns, and the Ottomans, who used much of the remaining cedar forests of Lebanon as fuel in steam trains in the early 20th century. Despite two millennia of deforestation, forests in Lebanon still cover 13.6% of the country, and other wooded lands represent 11%.

Law No. 558, which was ratified by the Lebanese Parliament on April 19, 1996, aims to protect and expand existing forests, classifying all forests of cedar, fir, high juniper, evergreen cypress and other trees, whether diverse or homogeneous, whether state-owned or not as conserved forests.

Since 2011, more than 600,000 trees, including cedars and other native species, have been planted throughout Lebanon as part of the Lebanon Reforestation Initiative, which aims to restore Lebanon's native forests. Projects financed locally and by international charity are performing extensive reforestation of cedar being carried out in the Mediterranean region, particularly in Lebanon and Turkey, where over 50 million young cedars are being planted annually.

The Lebanon Reforestation Initiative has been working with tree nurseries throughout Lebanon since 2012 to grow stronger seedlings with higher survival rates.

==== Turkey ====
Of the country's 78 million hectares of land in total, the Ministry of Agriculture and Forestry aims to increase Turkey's forest cover to 30% by 2023.

Four thousand years ago, Anatolia was 60% to 70% forested. Although the flora of Turkey remains more biodiverse than many European countries, deforestation occurred during both prehistoric and historic times, including the Roman and Ottoman periods.

Since the first forest code of 1937, the official government definition of 'forest' has varied. According to the current definition, 21 million hectares are forested, an increase of about 1 million hectares over the past thirty years, but only about half is 'productive'. However, according to the United Nations Food and Agriculture Organization definition of forest, about 12 million hectares was forested in 2015, about 15% of the land surface.

The amount of greenhouse gas emissions by Turkey removed by forests is very uncertain.As of 2019, however, a new assessment is being made with the help of satellites and new soil measurements and better information should be available by 2020. According to the World Resources Institute "Atlas of Forest Landscape Restoration Opportunities", 50 million hectares are potential forest land, a similar area to the ancient Anatolian forest mentioned above. This could help limit climate change in Turkey. To help preserve the biodiversity of Turkey, more sustainable forestry has been suggested. Improved rangeland management is also needed.

National Forestation Day is on 11 November but, according to the agriculture and forestry trade union, although volunteers planted a record number of trees in 2019, most had died by 2020 in part due to lack of rainfall.

=== North America ===
==== Canada ====
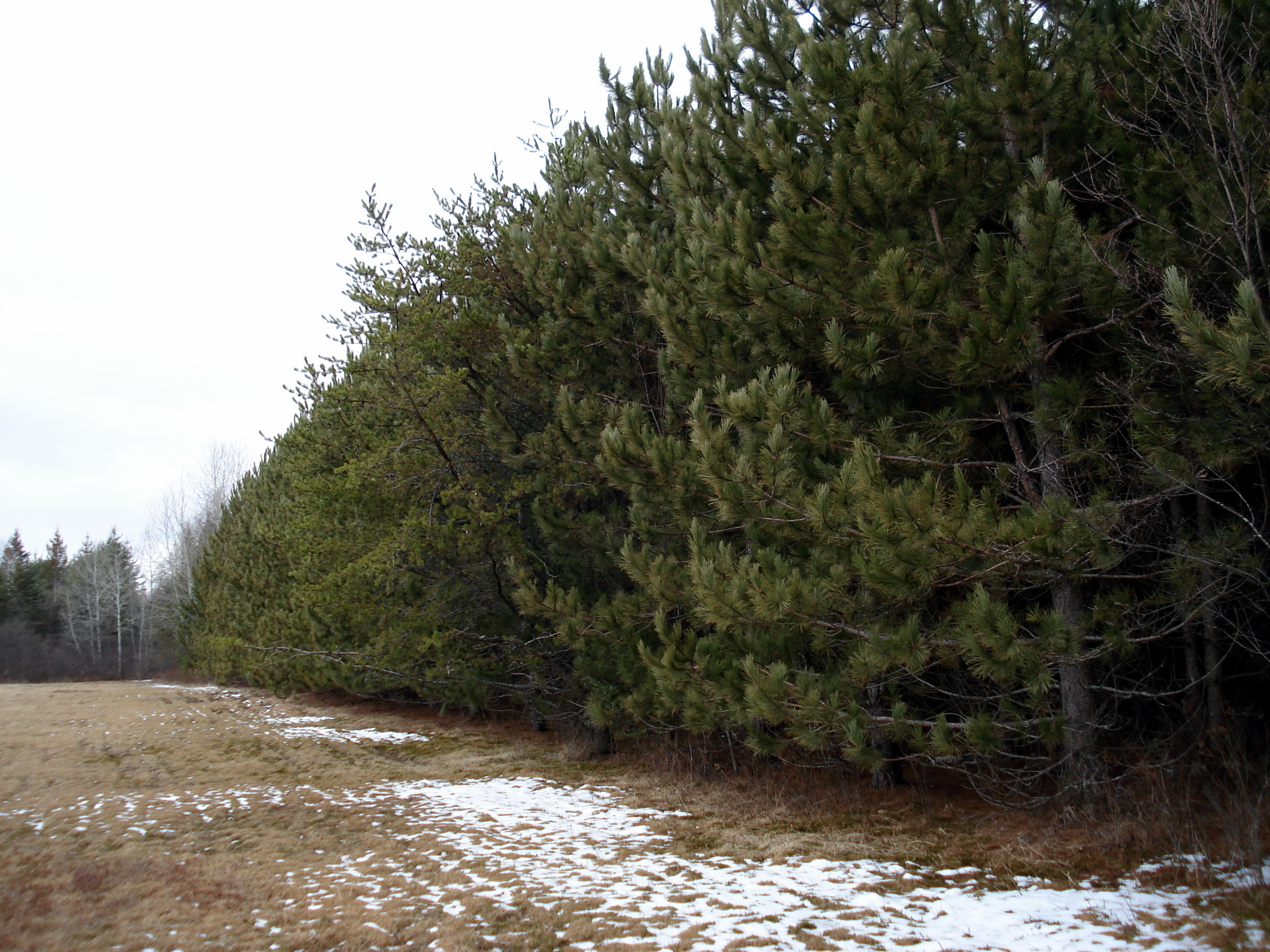
A 21-year-old plantation of red pine in southern Ontario

Natural Resources Canada (The Department of Natural Resources) states that the national forest cover was decreased by 0.34% from 1990 to 2015, and Canada has the lowest deforestation rate in the world. The forest industry is one of the main industries in Canada, which contributes about 7% of Canadian economy, and about 9% of the forests on Earth are in Canada. Therefore, Canada has many policies and laws to commit to sustainable forest management. For example, 94% of Canadian forests are public land, and the government obligates planting trees after harvesting to public forests.

==== United States ====
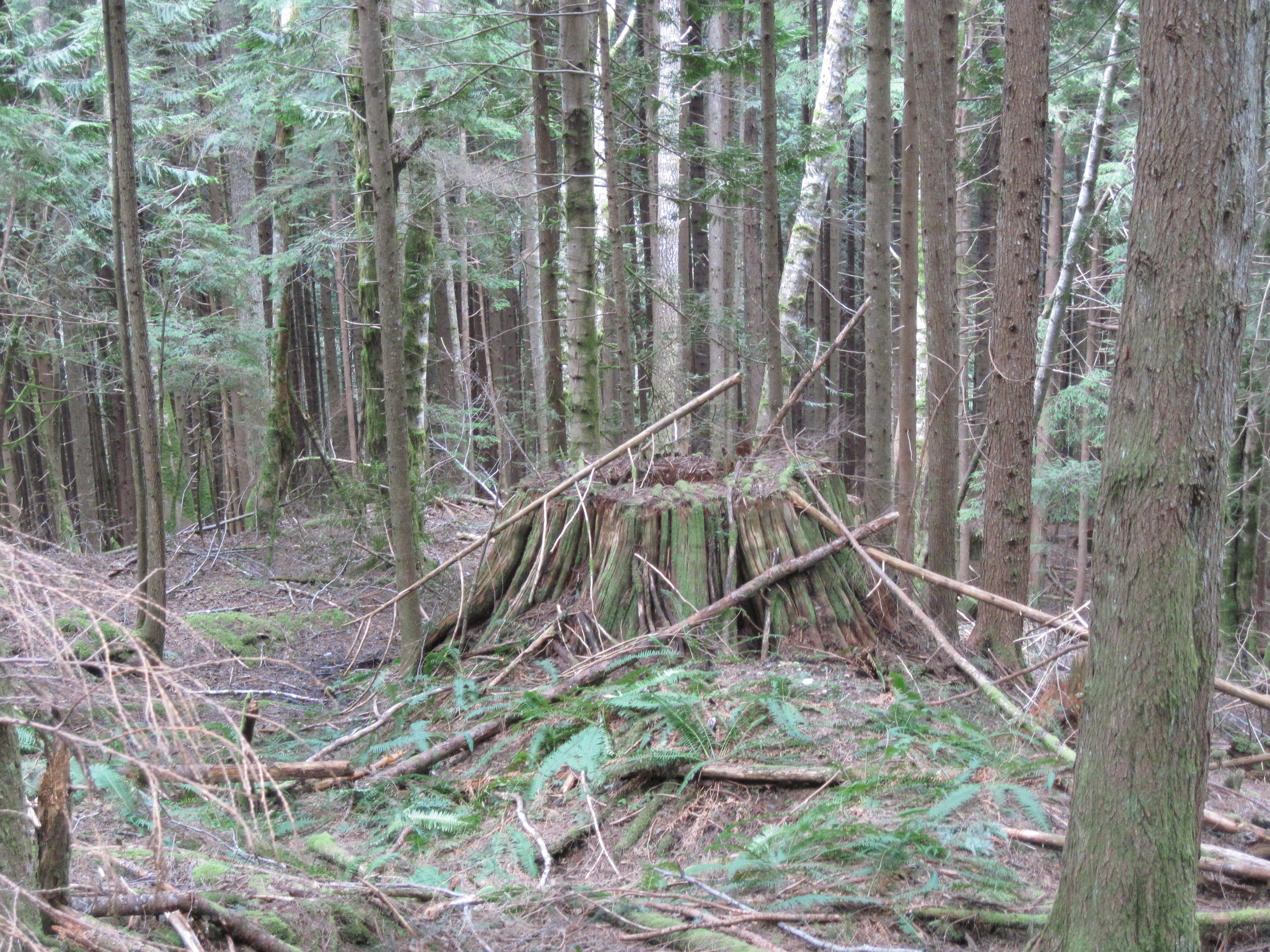
Forest regrowth in Mount Baker-Snoqualmie National Forest, Washington state, US

It is the stated goal of the United States Forest Service (USFS) to manage forest resources sustainably. This includes reforestation after timber harvest, among other programs.

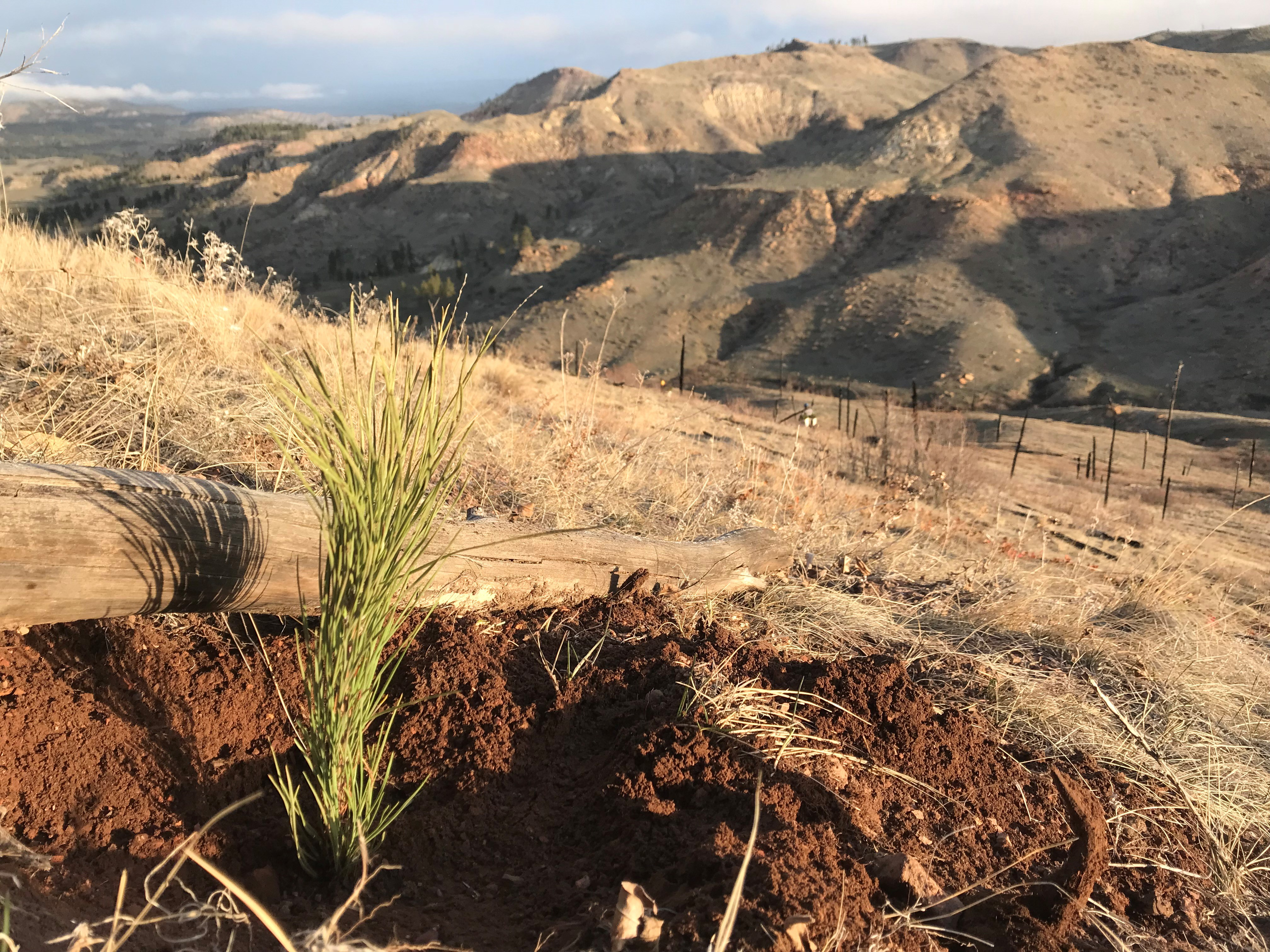
Reforestation in Montana, USA.

United States Department of Agriculture (USDA) data shows that forest occupied about 46% of total U.S. land in 1630 (when European settlers began to arrive in large numbers), but had decreased to 34% by 1910. After 1910, forest area has remained almost constant although the U.S. population has increased substantially. In the late 19th century, the USFS was established in part to address the concern of natural disasters due to deforestation, and new reforestation programs and federal laws such as the Knutson-Vandenberg Act (1930) were implemented. The USFS states that human-directed reforestation is required to support natural regeneration and the agency engages in ongoing research into effective ways to restore forests.

As for the year 2020, the U.S. planted 2.5 billion trees per year. At the beginning of the year 2020, a bill that will increase the number to 3.3 billion was proposed by the Republican Party, after President Donald Trump joined the Trillion Tree Campaign.

=== Latin America ===
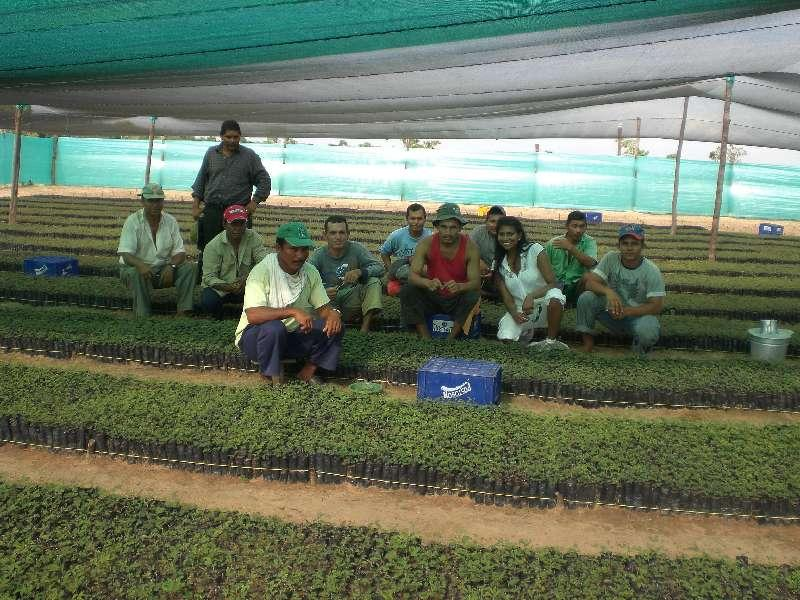
Tropical tree nursery at Planeta Verde Reforestación S.A.'s plantation in Vichada Department, Colombia

==== Bolivia ====
Training in reforestation for young people in Bolivia has been provided by Oxfam Intermón.

==== Costa Rica ====
Through reforestation and environmental conservation, Costa Rica doubled its forest cover in 30 years between 1989 and 2019.

Costa Rica has a long-standing commitment to the environment. The country is now one of the leaders of sustainability, biodiversity, and other protections. It wants to be completely fossil fuel free by 2050. The country has generated all of its electric power from renewable sources for three years as of 2019. It has committed to be carbon-free and plastic-free by 2021.

As of 2019, half of the country's land surface is covered with forests. They absorb a huge amount of carbon dioxide, combating climate change.

In the 1940s, more than 75% of the country was covered in mostly tropical rainforests and other indigenous woodlands. Between the 1940s and 1980s, extensive, uncontrolled logging led to severe deforestation. By 1983, only 26% of the country had forest cover. Realizing the devastation, policymakers took a stand. Through a continued environmental focus they were able to turn things around to the point that today forest cover has increased to 52%, two times more than 1983 levels.

Costa Rica introduced payments for ecological services (PES) which provided an economic incentive to conserve and restore the forest. Costa Rica doubled its forest cover in 30 years using its system of grants and other payments for environmental services, including compensation for landowners. One of the main programs established in Costa Rica was the Forest Promotion Certificate in 1979 and is funded by international donations and nationwide taxes. The initiative is helping to protect the forests in the country, and is now helped pass both the Forest Law in 1986 and FONAFIFO in 1990 which insures the continuity of the conservation programs.

Costa Rica's ambitious reforestation initiatives have transformed the landscape, fostering biodiversity, carbon sequestration, and sustainable land management practices.

==== Peru ====
Approximately 59% of Peru is covered by forest. A history of political turmoil and the government's inability to enforce environmental regulations has led to the degradation of the forest and environment in Peru. A military coup in 1968 caused a loss of economic mobility in the Talara region and sparked a boom in illegal logging due to the lack of alternative economic opportunities. Illegal mining and logging operations are responsible for a great deal of Peru's deforestation and environmental damage. The Peruvian government has not been able to enforce an environmentally conscious mining formalization plan to protect the Amazon forest in the Madre de Dios region. The 1980s were known in Peru as the "lost decade" due to a nationwide internal conflict and severe economic crisis almost destroying the country and resulting in the state losing control over several regions. Many areas in Peru, including Madre de Dios, had no state presence until the government initiated a movement to 'conquer and populate the Amazon,' with the hopes of minimizing illegal and informal mining operations that had expanded in the region and were polluting the Amazonian rivers and the destroying of its forests.

Reforestation initiatives have expanded in the country since. In Peru, reforestation is essential to preserving the livelihoods of rural communities because much of the population relies on the forest in some way. Deforestation also disproportionally affects indigenous communities in Peru, which is why reforestation efforts are essential for the protection of many communities' livelihoods.

=== Sub-Saharan Africa ===
One plan in this region, called Great Green Wall (Africa), involves planting a nine-mile width of trees on the Southern Border of the Sahara desert for stopping its expansion to the south. However, this is more of an afforestation project than a reforestation one.

In 2019, Ethiopia begun a massive tree planting campaign "Green Legacy" with a target to plant 4 billion trees in one year. In one day only, over 350 million trees were planted.

==== Nigeria ====
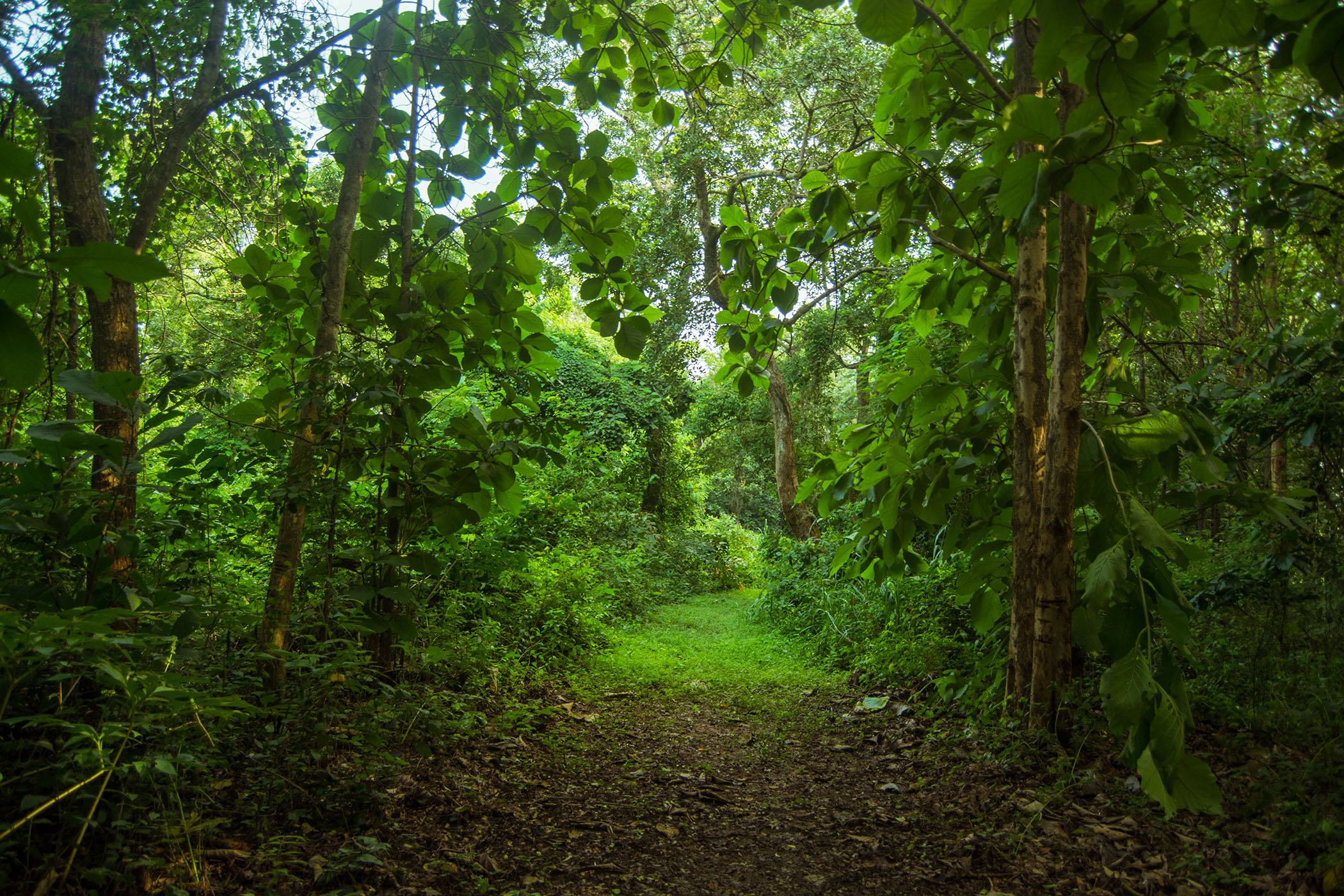
Forest nursery located in the compound of the Federal University of Agriculture, Abeokuta

Reforestation in Nigeria employs both natural and artificial methods. Reforestation involves the deliberate planting of trees and restoring forested areas that have been depleted or destroyed. It involves a planned restocking of the forest to ensure sustainable supply of timber and other forest products. Reforestation, in essence, involves replenishing forests to guarantee a consistent and sustainable supply of timber and various other forest resources. This objective can be accomplished through either natural regeneration techniques or artificial regeneration methods. Both of these approaches have been utilized in the reforestation efforts within Nigeria's forests. At the initiation of the reforestation program in Nigeria, the natural regeneration approach was chosen for two primary reasons. Firstly, it aimed to preserve the rainforest in its original state by allowing it to regenerate naturally from the existing seed bank in the soil. Secondly, and of significant importance, this method was selected due to budgetary constraints, as there were insufficient funds available to establish plantations through direct means.

== Organizations and programs ==
- Ecosia is a non-profit organization based in Berlin, Germany, that has planted over 100 million trees worldwide as of July 2020.
- Trees for the Future has assisted more than 170,000 families, in 6,800 villages of Asia, Africa and the Americas, to plant over 35 million trees.
- Ecologi is an organization that offers its members ways to support climate change solutions. This includes offsetting their carbon emissions and tree planting. So far over 50 million trees have been planted through Ecologi, as well a more than 2.2 million tonnes of CO2e reduced.
- Wangari Maathai, 2004 Nobel Peace Prize recipient, founded the Green Belt Movement which planted over 47 million trees to restore the Kenyan environment.
- Team Trees was a 2019 fundraiser with an initiative to plant 20 million trees. The initiative was started by American YouTubers MrBeast and Mark Rober, and was mostly supported by YouTubers. The Arbor Day Foundation will work with its local partners around the world to plant one tree for each dollar they raise.
- Trees For Life (Brooklyn Park) is a state based organization, which was established back in 1981 and delivers conservation, revegetation and community training programs. It now has thousands of active supporters and energizes activity within communities.
- Many companies are trying to achieve carbon offsets by nature-based solutions like reforestation, including mangrove forests and soil restoration. Among them are Microsoft and Eni. Increasing the forest cover of Earth by 25% will offset the human emissions in the last 20 years. In any case it will be necessary to pull from the atmosphere the CO_{2} that already have been emitted. However, this can work only if the companies will stop new emissions and stop deforestation.
- The 2020 World Economic Forum, held in Davos, announced the creation of the Trillion Tree Campaign, which is an initiative aiming to plant 1 trillion trees across the globe. The implementation can have big environmental and societal benefits but needs to be tailored to local conditions.
- The forest landscape restoration strategy seeks to rehabilitate landscapes and repair marginal and degraded areas in order to generate productive forest landscapes that are resilient and long-term. It aims to guarantee that diverse ecological and land-use functions are restored, safeguarded, and preserved over time.

== See also ==
- Forest restoration – Actions to reinstate forest health
- Forestry – Science and craft of managing woodlands
- Land rehabilitation – Part of environmental remediation
- Land restoration – Process of restoring land to a different state
- Mangrove restoration – Ecosystem regeneration
- Revegetation – Process of rebuilding disturbed soil
