= Mangrove restoration =

Ecosystem regeneration

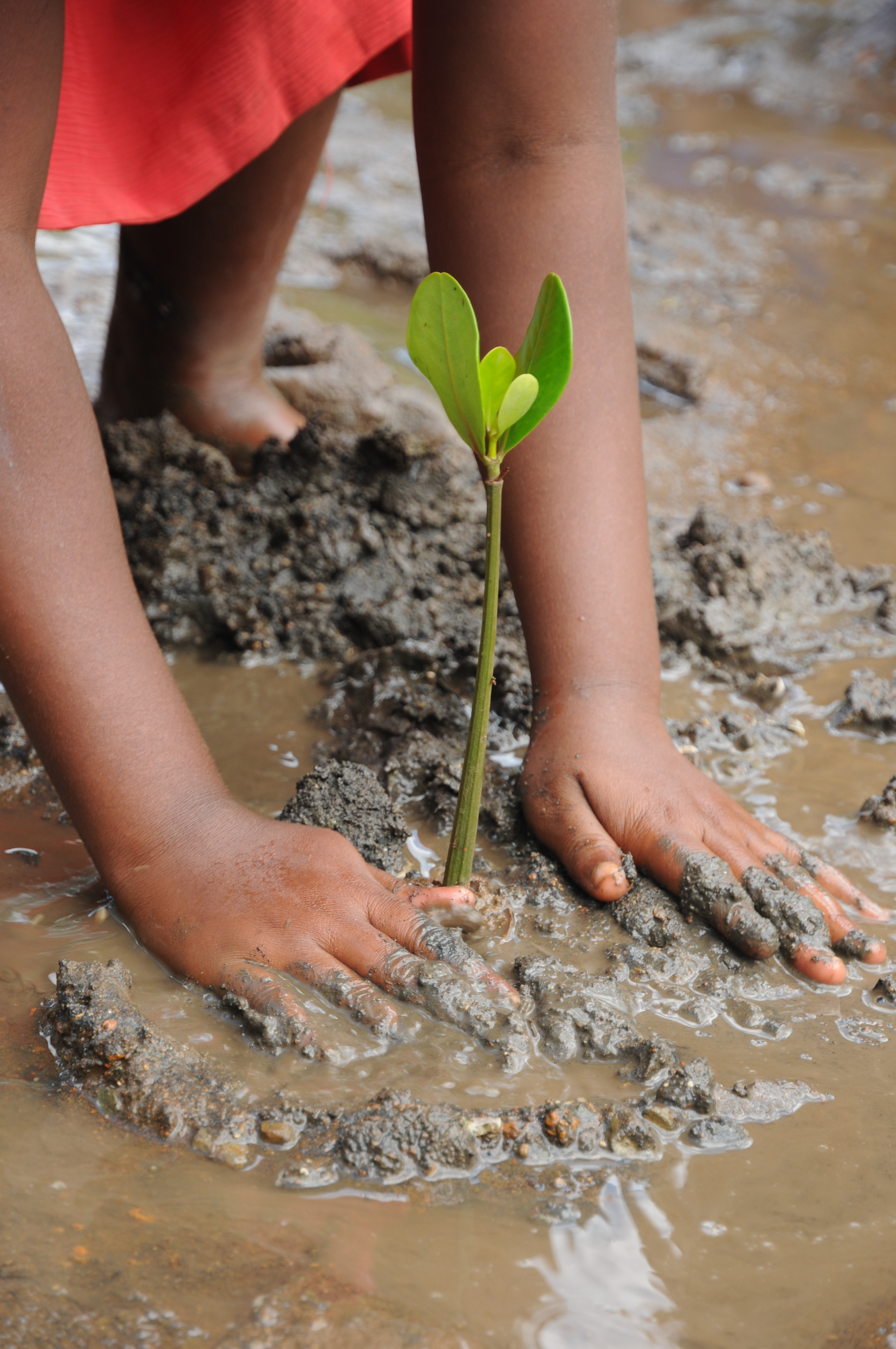
Mangrove replanting in Mayotte.

Mangrove restoration is the rehabilitation of degraded, damaged, or destroyed mangrove forest ecosystems to return them to a state comparable to their pre-disturbed conditions. Located throughout coastal wetlands of tropical and subtropical environments, mangroves provide essential ecosystem services such as water filtration, aquatic nurseries, medicinal materials, food, and lumber. Additionally, mangroves contribute to climate change mitigation through carbon sequestration and protection from coastal erosion, sea level rise, and storm surges. Human activities, such as deforestation, environmental pollution, and fossil fuel use, are drivers of a global decline in mangrove habitats.

Mangrove restoration is critical as mangrove habitat continues to rapidly decline. Different methods have been used to restore mangrove habitat, such as looking at historical topography, or mass seed dispersal. Fostering the long-term success of mangrove restoration is attainable by involving local communities through stakeholder engagement.

== Mangroves across the world ==
Mangroves are typically found in tropical regions of the world on the coasts of America, Australia, Asia, and Africa. Mangrove ecosystems are found in about 120 countries in the world and make up 0.7% of the world's tropical forests. In most of these regions mangroves provide many services including; shelter, climate regulation through carbon sequestration, decrease coastal erosion, create a link between terrestrial and marine ecosystems, and maintain water quality along the coast.

Mangroves have recently become susceptible to deforestation due to human activities and extreme weather. Aquaculture, agriculture, and urbanization are some of the reasons why mangroves are being damaged or destroyed.

== Environmental context ==
Historically, mangroves have been identified two different ways: the species of trees and shrubs that can tolerate brackish water conditions, or the species that fall under the mangrove family, Rhizophoraceae as well as trees of the genus Rhizophora. The majority of mangrove genera and families are not closely related, but they do however, share some adaptive commonalities. These unique qualities that allow mangroves to thrive in aversive conditions are pneumatophoric roots, stilt roots, salt-excreting leaves, and viviparous water-dispersed propagules. Mangrove communities occur between the latitudes of 30° N to 37° S and grow in waters where tidal height is between 1 and 4 meters. They can be found in various geographic areas from oceanic islands to riverine systems and in warm temperate climates to arid and wet tropics.

Despite having a relatively large range of habitat, mangroves thrive in optimal areas. In warmer, humid climates, mangrove canopies may reach a height of 30–40 m. In colder, arid environments, mangroves form isolated patches with stunted growth, reaching about 1–2 m.

== Functions and values of mangroves ==
Mangrove forests, along with the animal species they shelter, represent globally significant sources of biodiversity and provide humanity with valuable ecosystem services. They are used by mammals, reptiles and migratory birds as feeding and breeding grounds, and provide crucial habitats for fish and crustacean species of commercial importance. The Atlantic goliath grouper for instance, which is currently listed as critically endangered due to overfishing, utilizes mangroves as a nursery for the first 5–6 years of life. The roots of the mangrove physically buffer shorelines from the erosive impacts of ocean waves and storms. Additionally, they protect riparian zones by absorbing floodwaters and slowing down the flow of sediment-loaded river water. This allows sediments to drop to the bottom where they are held in place, thus containing potentially toxic waste products and improving the quality of water and sanitation in coastal communities.

To the human communities who rely on them, mangrove forests represent local sources of sustainable income from the harvest of fish and timber, as well as non-timber forest products such as medicinal plants, palm leaves and honey. On a global scale, they have been shown to sequester carbon in quantities comparable to higher-canopy terrestrial rainforests, which means that they may play a role in climate change mitigation. It has been shown that even though mangrove forests only account for 0.5% of the worlds coastal habitats it has a much higher sequestration rate of carbon compared to other coastal habitats (except for salt marshes). In addition to physically protecting coastlines from the projected sea-level rise associated with climate change.

=== Mangroves as climate change mitigation ===
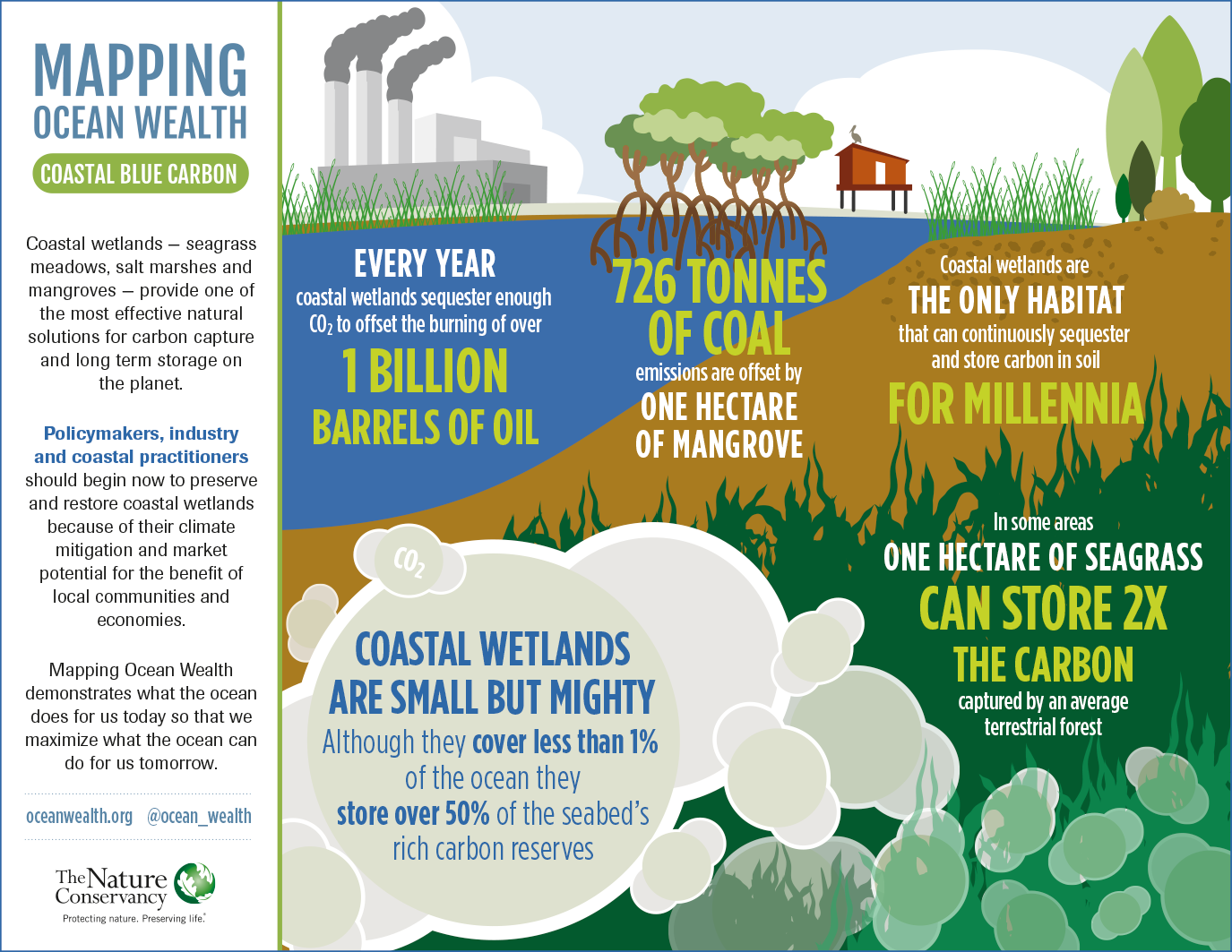
A summary of carbon storage in wetland ecosystems.

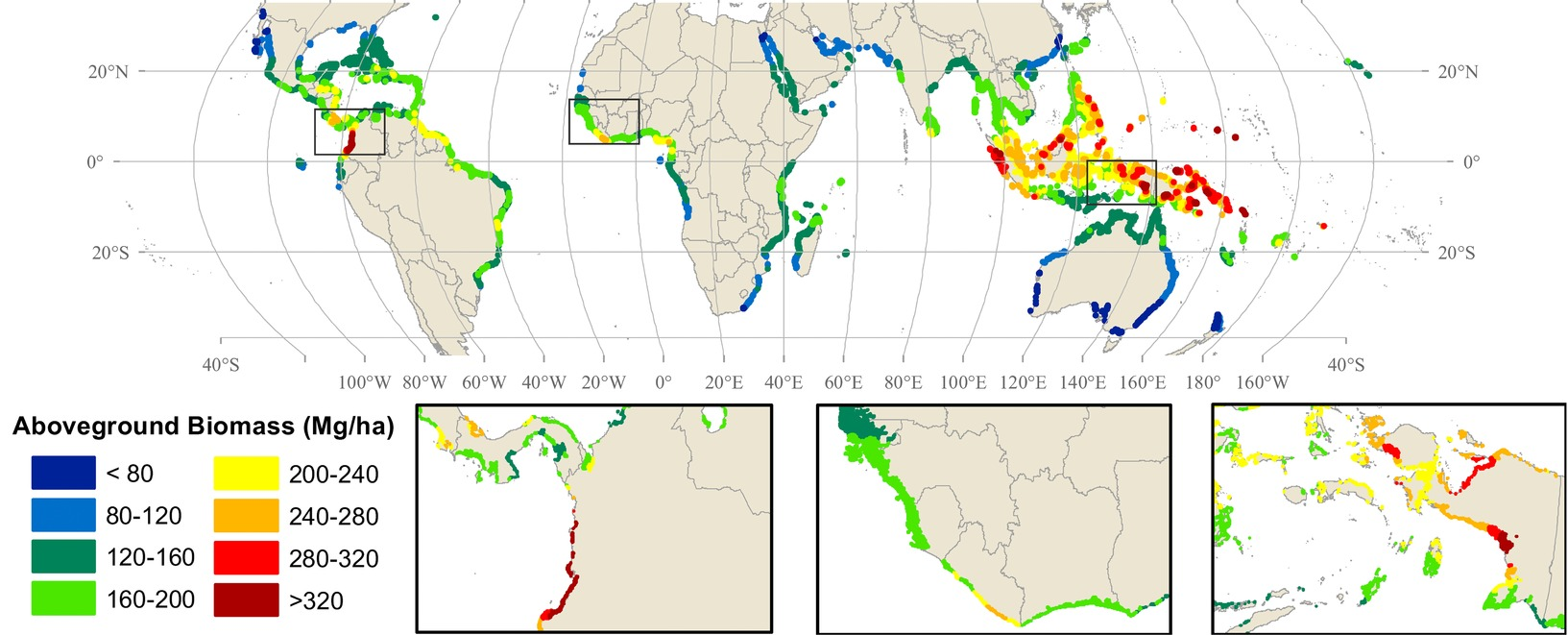
This map shows the estimated global distribution of above ground carbon storage in mangroves.

Mangrove forests have a potential to mitigate climate change, such as through the sequestration of carbon from the atmosphere directly, and by providing protection from storms, which are expected to become more intense and frequent into the 21st century. A summary of coastal wetland carbon, including mangroves, is seen in the accompanying image. Wetland plants, like mangroves, take in carbon dioxide when they perform photosynthesis. They then convert this into biomass made of complex carbon compounds. Being the most carbon-rich tropical forest, mangroves are highly productive and are found to store three to four times more carbon than other tropical forests. This is known as blue carbon. Mangroves make up only 0.7% of tropical forest area worldwide, yet studies calculate the effect of mangrove deforestation to contribute 10% of global CO_{2} emissions from deforestation.

The image to the right shows the global distribution of above ground carbon from mangroves. As can be seen, most of this carbon is located in Indonesia, followed by Brazil, Malaysia and Nigeria. Indonesia has one of the highest rates of mangrove loss, yet the most carbon stored from mangroves. Therefore, it is suggested that if the correct policy is implemented, countries like Indonesia can make considerable contributions to global carbon fluxes.

The UN estimate deforestation and forest degradation to make up 17% of global carbon emissions, which makes it the second most polluting sector, following the energy industry. The cost of this globally is estimated to total $42 billion. Therefore, in recent years, there has been more focus on the importance of mangroves, with initiatives being developed to use reforestation as a mitigation tool for climate change.

== Mangrove loss and degradation ==
The issue of restoration is critical today since mangrove forests are being lost very quickly – at an even faster rate than tropical rainforests inland. During the 1970s, mangroves occupied as much as 200,000 km^{2}, encompassing approximately 75% of the world's coastlines. Now, global mangrove area has experienced significant decline where at least 35% has been lost. Mangroves are continuing to diminish at a rate of 1-2% per year. Much of this lost mangrove area was destroyed to make room for industry, housing and tourism development; for aquaculture, primarily shrimp farms; and for agriculture, such as rice paddies, livestock pasture and salt production. Other drivers of mangrove forest destruction include activities that divert their sources of freshwater, such as groundwater withdrawals, the building of dams, and the building of roads and drainage canals across tidal flats.

Another indirect human activity, climate change, also threatens mangrove habitat. Sea levels are on the rise as polar ice caps melt from increasing temperatures and thermal expansion. Depending on sediment accumulation, mangrove habitats will generally respond to sea level change in three different ways: (1) If the sediment in the mangrove forest rises faster than the sea level, plants from further inland may move into the area as the mangroves retreat; (2) if the rate of sediment accumulation is equal to the rate of sea level rise, the forest survives and is stable during this period and (3) if the rate of soil accumulation is slower than the rate of sea level rise, the mangrove forest will be submerged by the sea. However, mangroves may then adapt and spread more inland as new territory is made for mangrove habitat. Changes may deviate from these three general scenarios depending on local morphological/topographical features. However, there are limits to the capacity of mangroves to adapt to climate change. It is projected that a 1-meter rise in sea level could inundate and destroy mangrove forests in many regions around the globe.

Mangroves play a vital role in delivering essential ecosystem services for the benefit of both humans and wildlife. The loss of these invaluable services will have a significant negative impact on the world. Mangrove habitat loss leaves coastal communities vulnerable to the risks of flooding, shoreline erosion, saline intrusion, and increased storm activity. Ecosystem services such as water purification and collection of raw materials are not possible if mangroves are utilized unsustainably. Furthermore, the decline of mangrove communities heavily impacts the plants and animals that rely on the habitat for survival. Loss of mangroves leads to reduced water quality, reduced biodiversity, increased sedimentation threatening coral reefs, and collapse of intertidal food webs and aquatic nurseries. Since mangroves are carbon sinks, their destruction can release large amounts of stored carbon and contribute to the effects of global warming.

== Restoration process ==
Mangroves are sensitive ecosystems, changing dynamically in response to storms, sediment blockage, and fluctuations in sea level and present a "moving target" for restoration efforts. Mangroves are considered to be one of the easiest coastal systems to restore because of their seedlings ability to survive where adult trees are not present. The most common method simply consists in planting single-species stands of mangroves in areas thought to be suitable, without consideration of whether or not they supported mangroves in the past. This approach usually fails over the long term because the underlying soil and hydrological requirements of the mangroves are not being met. Mangrove survival is dependent on many factors including soil salinity, sedimentation, groundwater availability, and tidal changes which can vary greatly in small areas. This means, each tree in a mangrove forest will grow slightly different resulting from its unique surrounding conditions.

More informed methods aim to bring a damaged mangrove area back into its preexisting condition, taking into account not only ecosystem factors but also social, cultural and political perspectives. These approaches begin with the understanding that a damaged mangrove area may be able to repair itself through the natural processes of secondary succession, without being physically planted, provided that its tidal and freshwater hydrology is functioning normally and there is an adequate supply of seedlings. If natural renewal does occur, Twilley et al. 1996 predicts species composition will be largely determined by the very earliest saplings to colonize the recovering stand. This prediction is supported by the actual studies of Clarke et al. 2000, Clarke et al. 2001, Ross et al. 2006 and Sousa et al. 2007.

A second approach to mangrove restoration is the ecological mangrove restoration (EMR) approach. This approach mainly focuses on correcting the hydrology of a mangrove ecosystem for long lasting health of the area while the plantation approach does not truly take into account the dynamics of the ecosystem. While some planting may be required in the EMR approach, the expectation is that mangrove seedlings will be able to naturally recolonize. Steps to the EMR approach are as follows:

1. Assess the ecology, especially reproduction and distribution patterns, of the mangrove species at the disturbed site;
2. Map the topographical elevations and hydrological patterns that determine how seedlings should establish themselves at the site;
3. Assess the changes made to the site that currently prevent the site from recovering by itself;
4. Design a restoration plan that begins by restoring the normal range of elevations and tidal hydrology at the site; and
5. Monitor the site to determine if the restoration has been successful in light of the original objectives.

This may include introducing structures such as detached breakwaters, to protect the site from wave action and allow for adequate sediment build-up. The actual planting of seedlings is a last resort, since it fails in many cases; it should be considered only if natural recruitment of seedlings fails to reach the restoration objective.

External videos
- Drones planting one billion trees at a time, Susan Graham, Hello Tomorrow Challenge Grand Finale, Biocarbon Engineering Summit, 2015
- These seed-firing drones plant thousands of trees each day, World Economic Forum

Restoring mangroves by traditional methods, manually, is slow and difficult work. An alternative has been proposed to use quadcopters to carry and deposit seed pods. According to Irina Fedorenko and Susan Graham of BioCarbon Engineering, a drone can do an amount of work in days that is equivalent to weeks of planting by humans using traditional methods, at a fraction of the cost. Drones can also carry and plant seeds in difficult-to-reach or dangerous areas where humans cannot work easily. Drones can be used to develop planting patterns for areas and to monitor growth of new forests.

=== Costs and financing ===
Successful mangrove restoration would require an estimated US$0.3–1.6 billion per year until 2050. It has been proposed that some of these costs could be covered by adapting debt-for-nature swaps to direct finances towards mangrove restoration.

=== Stakeholder engagement ===
An important but often overlooked aspect of mangrove restoration efforts is the role that the local communities play as stakeholders in the process and the outcome. If a restoration project is put in place without support of the local community, it may result in backlash, wasted funding, and wasted efforts. An important aspect to consider is whether society deems if restoration of mangroves is worth the investment effort. This is ultimately determined by human self interest, and whether the decision will maximize their personal utility. Another obstacle that projects may face is how to quantify the economic value of mangrove restoration. Ecological services of mangroves are difficult to determine, "as most of them are of indirect nature and non-marketed." Beyond direct labor inputs, mangrove restoration generates a diverse array of indirect marketable benefits, including ecotourism, sustainable aquaculture, and green employment in environmental monitoring. While such benefits may not be quantifiable at present, they represent markedly positive impacts from the current perspective. Support of local communities are a crucial aspect in the long-term success of mangrove restoration. Not only can locals provide knowledge about the environment, their participation through employment and funding strategies will encourage them to keep maintaining the mangroves after initial success of the project. Nevertheless, the prospects for these jobs are associated benefits remain unfavorable. Most of these positions are short-term and reliant on donations, carrying the risk of termination once project funding ceases. Furthermore, women, youth and Indigenous groups remain underrepresented in management bodies, creating deficiencies in the sustainability and equity of such employment opportunities.

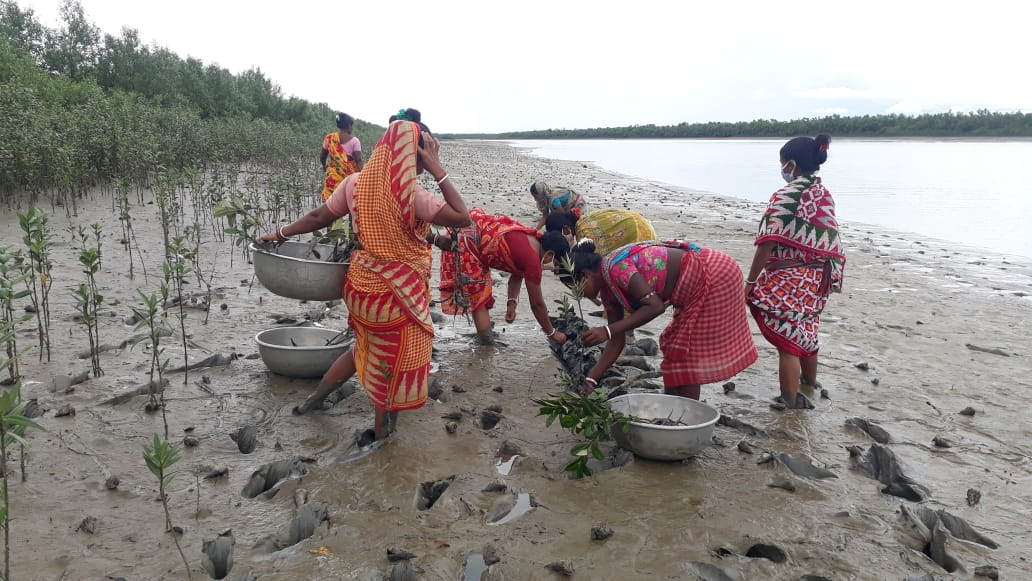
Local community takes care of Mangrove Plantation in Sundarbans.

A case study in the Philippines showed that locals can play a major participatory role in mangrove restoration projects, so encouraging and strengthening their participation is particularly important. However, in order for participation to occur, there must be benefits and incentives provided to engage the community. If benefits are not received, local people are discouraged from participating. Participation in mangrove restoration improves livelihoods and increases social capital, which directly benefits their access to information and services. Participation in mangrove restoration can provide more than just tangible benefits, it also leads to more sustainable and long-term rewards. For example, according to a survey, Filipino fishers in Palawan generally recognise the importance of mangrove conservation and its direct benefits of increased fishstocks and improved food security.

=== Reducing emissions from deforestation and forest degradation ===
It is estimated that approximately 15% of total anthropogenic carbon emissions a year can be attributed to carbon emissions from tropical deforestation. In 2008, the United Nations launched the "Reducing Emissions from Deforestation and forest Degradation (REDD)" program to combat climate change through the reduction of carbon emissions and enhancement of carbon sinks from forests. It is the opinion of literary scholars that the REDD program can increase carbon sequestration from mangroves and therefore reduce carbon in the atmosphere. The REDD+ mechanism, as part of the REDD program, provides financial support to stakeholders in developing countries to avoid deforestation and forest degradation. The estimated impacts of REDD+ globally, could reach up to 2.5 billion tons of CO_{2} each year.

An examples of REDD+ implementation can be seen in Thailand, where carbon markets give farmers incentive to conserve mangrove forests, by compensating for the opportunity cost of shrimp farming.

=== Mangroves for the Future ===
Moreover, the Mangroves for the Future (MFF) initiative, led by IUCN and UNDP, encourages the rehabilitation of mangroves by engaging with local stakeholders and creating a platform for change. In Indonesia, one project planted 40,000 mangroves, which then encouraged local government to take up similar initiatives on a larger scale. Mangrove restoration and protection is also seen as a climate change mitigation strategy under COP21, the international agreement to target climate change, with countries being able to submit their plans in their Nationally Appropriate Mitigation Actions (NAMAs). Ten of the world's least developed countries are now prioritizing mangrove restoration in their NAMAs.

== See also ==
- UN Decade on Ecosystem Restoration
- Reforestation
