= Bonn Challenge =

Global effort to restore the world's degraded and deforested lands

The Bonn Challenge is a global effort to restore 150 million hectares of the world's degraded and deforested lands by 2020 and 350 million hectares by 2030. It was hosted and launched by Germany and the International Union for Conservation of Nature (IUCN) in Bonn on 2 September 2011, in collaboration with the Global Partnership on Forest/Landscape Restoration and targets delivery on the Rio Conventions and other outcomes of the 1992 Earth Summit. As at 2013 over 20 million hectares of land had been pledged for restoration from countries including Brazil, Costa Rica, El Salvador, Rwanda, and the United States. South Korea, Costa Rica, Pakistan, China, Rwanda and Brazil have embarked on successful landscape restoration programmes.

The IUCN estimates that fulfilling the goals of the Bonn challenge would create approximately $84 billion per year in net benefits that could positively affect income opportunities for rural communities. It is also estimated that a reduction of the current carbon dioxide emissions gap by 11-17% will be achieved by meeting the challenge. Pakistan's Khyber Pakhtunkhwa pledge has the distinction of being the first sub-national pledge, the first pledge to be fully implemented, and the first pledge to be increased. 'Billion Tree Tsunami' is an initiative in that direction.|

The Bonn challenge will address the issue of economic security, water security, food security and climate change. Landscape restoration through the Bonn Challenge augments international commitments to climate change. The restoration of 150 million hectares of the world's degraded and deforested lands by 2020 will help in sequestration of 1 billion metric tons of carbon dioxide which will reduce the current emission gap by 20%.

The African Forest Landscape Restoration Initiative fits within the Bonn Challenge and has a goal of having 100 million hectares in the process of restoring by 2030. 28 African countries have made a total commitment of 113 million hectares to the initiative. Ethiopia has made the largest single commitment with 1 million hectares. Ethiopian Prime Minister Abiy Ahmed announced in May 2019 that the country had set a goal of planting 4 billion trees in 2019 alone.

== See also ==
- Afforestation
- Forest restoration
