= Minorisa minuta =

Scientific classification
- Domain: Eukaryota
- Clade: Sar
- Clade: Rhizaria
- Phylum: Cercozoa
- Subphylum: Filosa
- Class: Chlorarachniophyceae
- Order: Minorisida
- Family: Minorisidae
- Genus: Minorisa
- Species: M. minuta

Binomial name
- Minorisa minuta Del Campo in Del Campo et al. 2013

Species of protist

Minorisa minuta is a species of marine heterotrophic flagellates that is heavily featured in the eukaryotic picoplankton of coastal ecosystems.

== Etymology ==
The generic name Minorisa comes from the town Manresa, the birthplace of Javier del Campo, who first described the genus in 2013. The specific epithet minuta, Latin for tiny, refers to the small size of the organism.

== Description of organism ==
=== Morphology and anatomy ===
Minorisa minuta is a unicellular organism with naked and spherical, ellipsoid or ovoid cells. They are minuscule, only 1–2.9 micrometers long and 0.8–2.3 micrometers wide. It possesses a single flagellum that can be up to four times its length. Minorisa swims by rotating along its longitudinal axis.

=== Life cycle ===
Minorisa minuta has an amoeboid life stage. This amoeboid stage has lobose and extrusive pseudopodia.

=== Genetics and phylogeny ===
Molecular phylogenetics places Minorisa minuta at the base of the Chlorarachniophytes. Minorisa is the only heterotrophic representative within the Chlorarachniophytes, which is the only photosynthetic group within the supergroup Rhizaria. It is unknown whether Minorisa posteriorly lost the plastid or whether the lack of a plastid in Minorisa indicates a second instance of acquisition of a green plastid independently in Chlorarachniophytes.
