= Minorisa =

Scientific classification
- Domain: Eukaryota
- Clade: Sar
- Clade: Rhizaria
- Phylum: Cercozoa
- Subphylum: Filosa
- Class: Chlorarachniophyceae
- Order: Minorisida; Cavalier-Smith 2018
- Family: Minorisidae; Cavalier-Smith 2018
- Genus: Minorisa; Del Campo in Del Campo et al. 2013

Species
- Minorisa fusiformis; Minorisa magna; Minorisa megafusiformis; Minorisa minuta

Genus of flagellates

Minorisa is a genus of marine heterotrophic flagellates that is heavily featured in the eukaryotic picoplankton of coastal ecosystems. It is part of the supergroup Rhizaria, at the base of the class Chlorarachniophyceae. It belongs to its own family Minorisidae and order Minorisida.

== Etymology ==
The name Minorisa comes from the town Manresa, the birthplace of Javier del Campo, who first described the genus in 2013.

== History of knowledge ==
Culturing bias is the tendency to study organisms that are easily cultured and this bias was rampant in the past study of protist phylogeny, ecology, and evolution. There are a myriad of reasons why organisms may be reluctant to culturing. Heterotrophic protists are particularly difficult to culture because culturing a heterotroph necessitates knowing its prey and culturing it consecutively. Another reason why organisms may be reluctant to culturing is due to size. Organisms that are only micrometers long tend to pass through the plankton nets that are typically used by oceanographers to survey they microscopic organisms living in bodies of water.

One way that scientists attempt to overcome culturing bias is by using environmental sequencing, a method that determines the genetic sequence everything found in a sample of water, rather than only the cells scooped up by a plankton net. Environmental sequencing aims to isolate organisms that are reluctant to being cultured but are abundant in the environment. One such environmental sequencing study in 2013 captured an unknown rhizarian when attempting to culture ecologically relevant heterotrophic flagellates off the coast of Spain. The rhizarian isolate was genetically distant from any described species, but it matched environmental sequences from the Mediterranean Sea, the Sargasso Sea, and the English Channel. This rhizarian was named Minorisa minuta and thus the genus Minorisa was born. Later in 2019, a group isolated several more strains of Minorisa off the coast of Japan, expanding the known size of the genus to four species.

== Habitat and ecology ==
Minorisa are marine heterotrophic flagellates that swim and are active bacterial grazers. They are well adapted to low prey abundances and very efficient at ingesting bacteria. They are widely distributed and abundant in oceans worldwide, accounting for up to 5% of all heterotrophic flagellates in the world. Minorisa are present in ocean all year long particularly near coastal areas, though abundances vary depending on site, suggesting pockets of population density.

== Description of organism ==
=== Morphology and anatomy ===
Minorisa is a unicellular organism with naked cells that are spherical, ellipsoid or ovoid in shape. They are minuscule, only 1–4.3 micrometers long and 0.8–3.5 micrometers wide. This explains why Minorisa had not been picked up by other survey methods, since most nets used to capture protists are not fine enough to trap such a tiny organism. Minorisa possesses a single flagellum that up to four times its length, which is wrapped around the cell. Minorisa swims by rotating about its longitudinal axis.

=== Life cycle ===
Minorisa is known to have an amoeboid life stage that lacks a flagellum. In its amoeboid state, cells have lobose and/or extrusive pseudopodia.

=== Genetics and phylogeny ===
Molecular phylogenetics places Minorisa at the base of the chlorarachniophytes. Minorisa is the only heterotrophic representative within the chlorarachniophytes, which is the only photosynthetic group within the supergroup Rhizaria. It is unknown whether Minorisa posteriorly lost the plastid or whether the lack of a plastid in Minorisa indicates a second instance of acquisition of a green plastid independently in chlorarachniophytes.

== Practical importance ==
Minorisa represents one of the main players in the eukaryotic picoplankton of coastal ecosystems, possibly having a relevant role in carbon fluxes and controlling bacterial populations. Minorisa in coastal waters could be as important as MAST (marine stramenopiles) in open ocean, considered abundant bacterivores.
