= State of the Coast =

The State of the Coast is a website launched by the National Oceanic and Atmospheric Administration (NOAA) in March 2010. The site contains quick facts and detailed statistics offered on communities, economy, ecology, and climate. The website aims to communicate and highlight the connections among a healthy coastal ecosystem, a robust U.S. economy, a safe population, and a sustainable quality of life for coastal residents.

The Web site is periodic, and is updated on a monthly basis.

== Communities Topics ==
The U.S. Population Living in Coastal Counties

Swimming at Our Nation's Beaches

Marine Protected Areas: Conserving our Nation's Marine Resources

== Economy Topics ==
The Coast - Our Nation's Economic Engine

Recreational Fishing - An American Pastime

Commercial Fishing - A Cultural Tradition

Ports - Crucial Coastal Infrastructure

== Response Topics ==
The Overall Health of Our Nation's Coastal Waters

Invasive Species Disrupt Coastal Ecosystems and Economies

Coral Reef Ecosystems - Critical Coastal Habitat

Nutrient Pollution and Hypoxia - Everything is Upstream of the Coast

== Climate Topics ==
Vulnerability of Our Nation's Coasts to Sea Level Rise

U.S. Population in the 100-year Coastal Flood Hazard Area

Federally-Insured Assets along the Coast
