= Marine coastal ecosystem =

Wildland-ocean interface

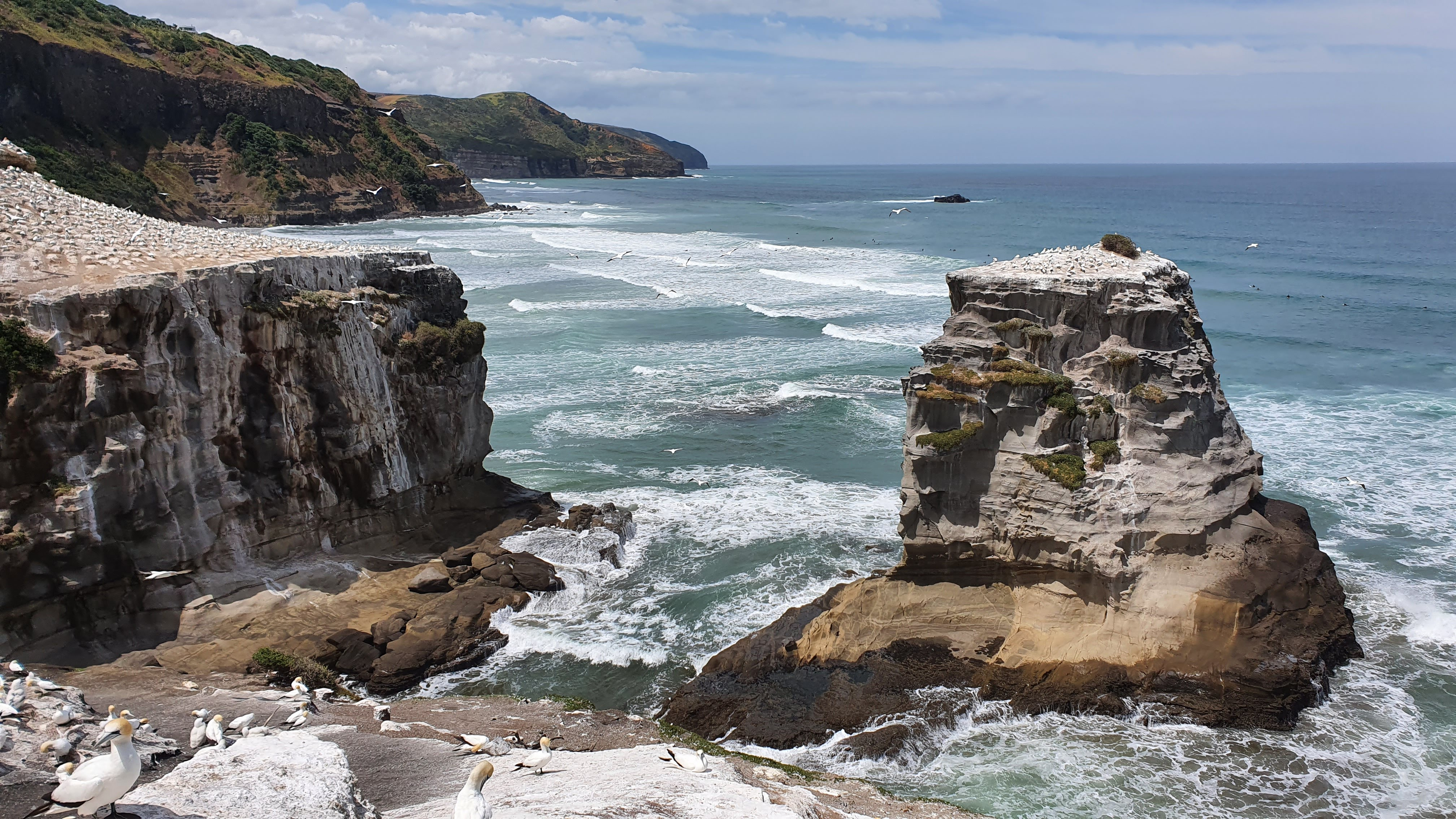
Coastal gannet colony

A marine coastal ecosystem is a marine ecosystem which occurs where the land meets the ocean. Worldwide there is about 620,000 kilometres (390,000 mi) of coastline. Coastal habitats extend to the margins of the continental shelves, occupying about 7 percent of the ocean surface area. Marine coastal ecosystems include many very different types of marine habitats, each with their own characteristics and species composition. They are characterized by high levels of biodiversity and productivity.

For example, estuaries are areas where freshwater rivers meet the saltwater of the ocean, creating an environment that is home to a wide variety of species, including fish, shellfish, and birds. Salt marshes are coastal wetlands which thrive on low-energy shorelines in temperate and high-latitude areas, populated with salt-tolerant plants such as cordgrass and marsh elder that provide important nursery areas for many species of fish and shellfish. Mangrove forests survive in the intertidal zones of tropical or subtropical coasts, populated by salt-tolerant trees that protect habitat for many marine species, including crabs, shrimp, and fish.

Further examples are coral reefs and seagrass meadows, which are both found in warm, shallow coastal waters. Coral reefs thrive in nutrient-poor waters on high-energy shorelines that are agitated by waves. They are underwater ecosystem made up of colonies of tiny animals called coral polyps. These polyps secrete hard calcium carbonate skeletons that builds up over time, creating complex and diverse underwater structures. These structures function as some of the most biodiverse ecosystems on the planet, providing habitat and food for a huge range of marine organisms. Seagrass meadows can be adjacent to coral reefs. These meadows are underwater grasslands populated by marine flowering plants that provide nursery habitats and food sources for many fish species, crabs and sea turtles, as well as dugongs. In slightly deeper waters are kelp forests, underwater ecosystems found in cold, nutrient-rich waters, primarily in temperate regions. These are dominated by a large brown algae called kelp, a type of seaweed that grows several meters tall, creating dense and complex underwater forests. Kelp forests provide important habitats for many fish species, sea otters and sea urchins.

Directly and indirectly, marine coastal ecosystems provide vast arrays of ecosystem services for humans, such as cycling nutrients and elements, and purifying water by filtering pollutants. They sequester carbon as a cushion against climate change. They protect coasts by reducing the impacts of storms, reducing coastal erosion and moderating extreme events. They provide essential nurseries and fishing grounds for commercial fisheries. They provide recreational services and support tourism. These ecosystems are vulnerable to various anthropogenic and natural disturbances, such as pollution, overfishing, and coastal development, which have significant impacts on their ecological functioning and the services they provide. Climate change is impacting coastal ecosystems with sea level rises, ocean acidification, and increased storm frequency and intensity. When marine coastal ecosystems are damaged or destroyed, there can be serious consequences for the marine species that depend on them, as well as for the overall health of the ocean ecosystem. Some conservation efforts are underway to protect and restore marine coastal ecosystems, such as establishing marine protected areas and developing sustainable fishing practices.

== Overview ==
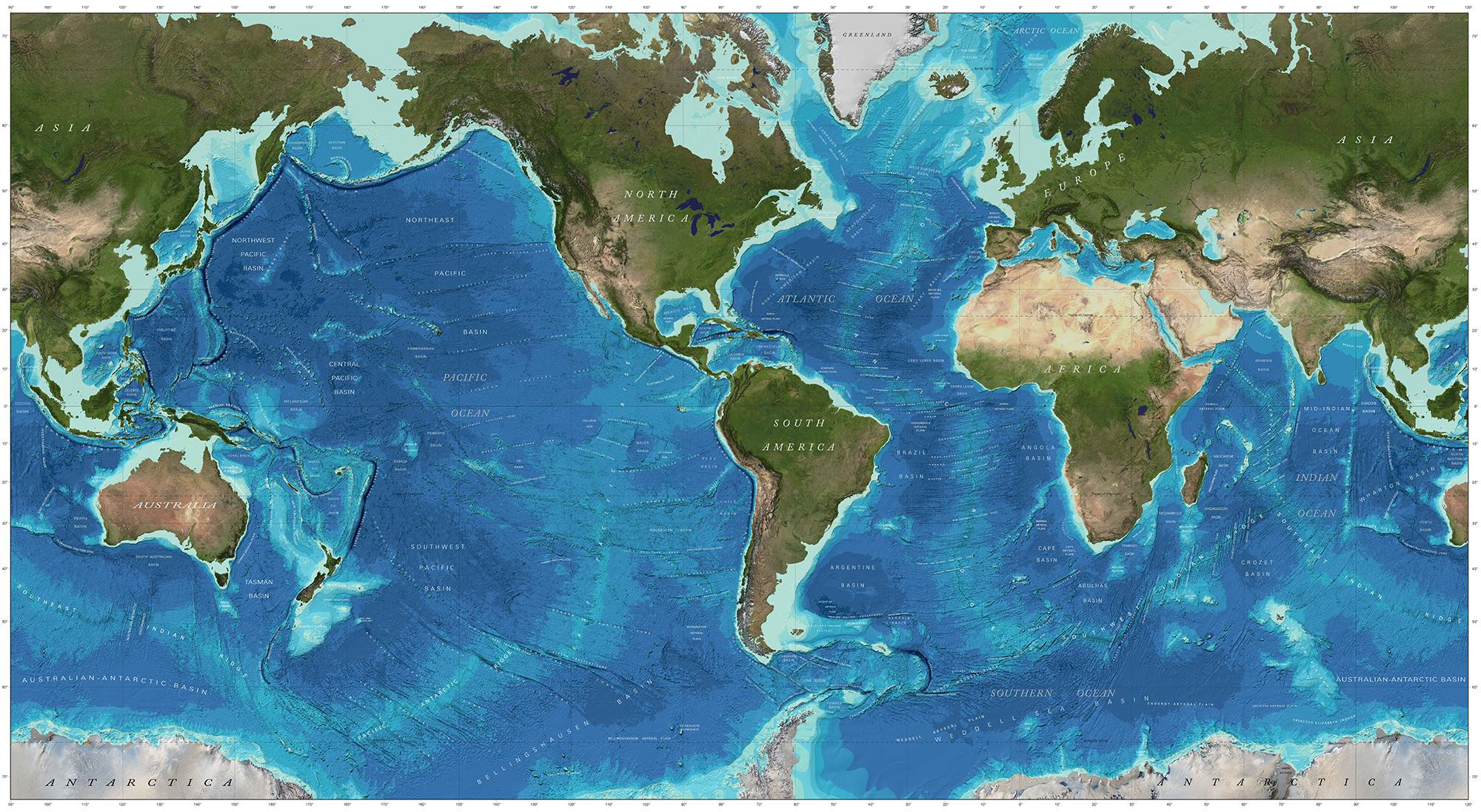
Global continental shelf, highlighted in light blue

Profile of the continental shelf, illustrating the shelf, slope and rise

The Earth has approximately 620,000 kilometres (390,000 mi) of coastline. Coastal habitats extend to the margins of the continental shelves, occupying about 7 percent by area of the Earth's oceans. These coastal seas are highly productive systems, providing an array of ecosystem services to humankind, such as processing of nutrient effluents from land and climate regulation. However, coastal ecosystems are threatened by human-induced pressures such as climate change and eutrophication. Recent studies have shown that over half of the world's population lives within 200km or so of a coastline, making these areas particularly susceptible to compounding pressures from climate change, lack of resources, and socioeconomic changes, illustrating that the future of coastal human-natural systems are now caught in a 'perfect storm'. The energy and resource consumption can clearly not be sustained, which poses a large challenge to coastal areas. In the coastal zone, the fluxes and transformations of nutrients and carbon sustaining coastal ecosystem functions and services are strongly regulated by benthic (that is, occurring at the seafloor) biological and chemical processes.

Coastal systems also contribute to the regulation of climate and nutrient cycles, by efficiently processing anthropogenic emissions from land before they reach the ocean. The high value of these ecosystem services is obvious considering that a large proportion of the world population lives close to the coast.

Currently, coastal seas around the world are undergoing major ecological changes driven by human-induced pressures, such as climate change, anthropogenic nutrient inputs, overfishing and the spread of invasive species. In many cases, the changes alter underlying ecological functions to such an extent that new states are achieved and baselines are shifted.

In 2015, the United Nations established 17 Sustainable Development Goals with the aim of achieving certain targets by 2030. Their mission statement for their 14th goal, Life below water, is to "conserve and sustainably use the oceans, seas and marine resources for sustainable development". The United Nations has also declared 2021–2030 the UN Decade on Ecosystem Restoration, but restoration of coastal ecosystems is not receiving appropriate attention.

== Coastal habitats ==
=== Intertidal zone ===
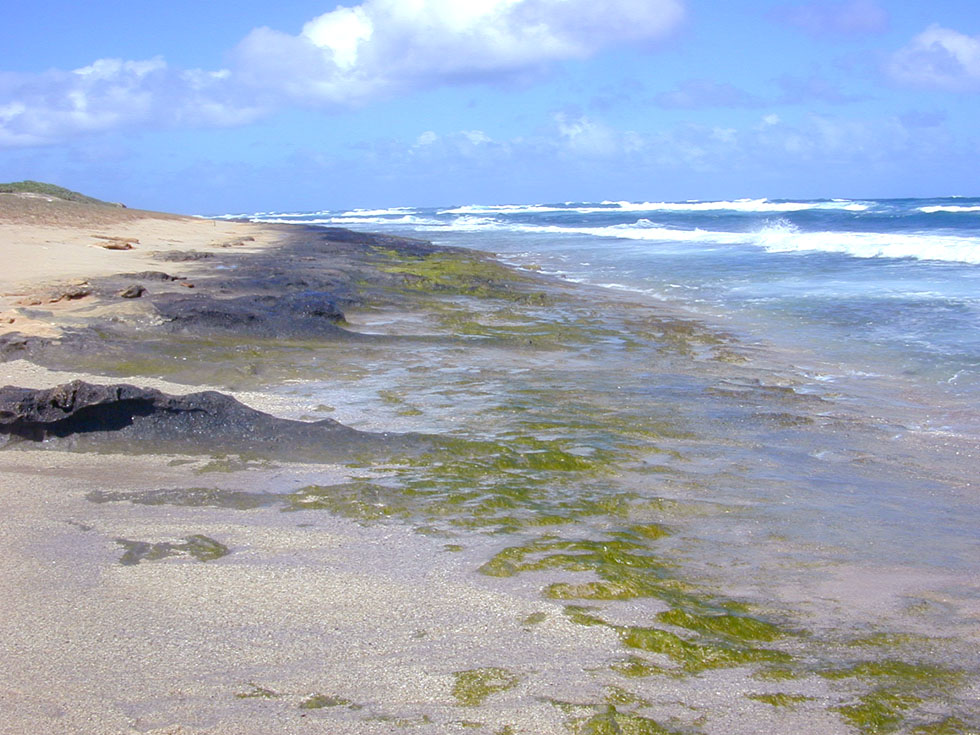
Intertidal zones

Intertidal zones are the areas that are visible and exposed to air during low tide and covered up by saltwater during high tide. There are four physical divisions of the intertidal zone with each one having its distinct characteristics and wildlife. These divisions are the Spray zone, High intertidal zone, Middle Intertidal zone, and Low intertidal zone. The Spray zone is a damp area that is usually only reached by the ocean and submerged only under high tides or storms. The high intertidal zone is submerged at high tide but remains dry for long periods between high tides. Due to the large variance of conditions possible in this region, it is inhabited by resilient wildlife that can withstand these changes such as barnacles, marine snails, mussels and hermit crabs. Tides flow over the middle intertidal zone two times a day and this zone has a larger variety of wildlife. The low intertidal zone is submerged nearly all the time except during the lowest tides and life is more abundant here due to the protection that the water gives.

=== Estuaries ===
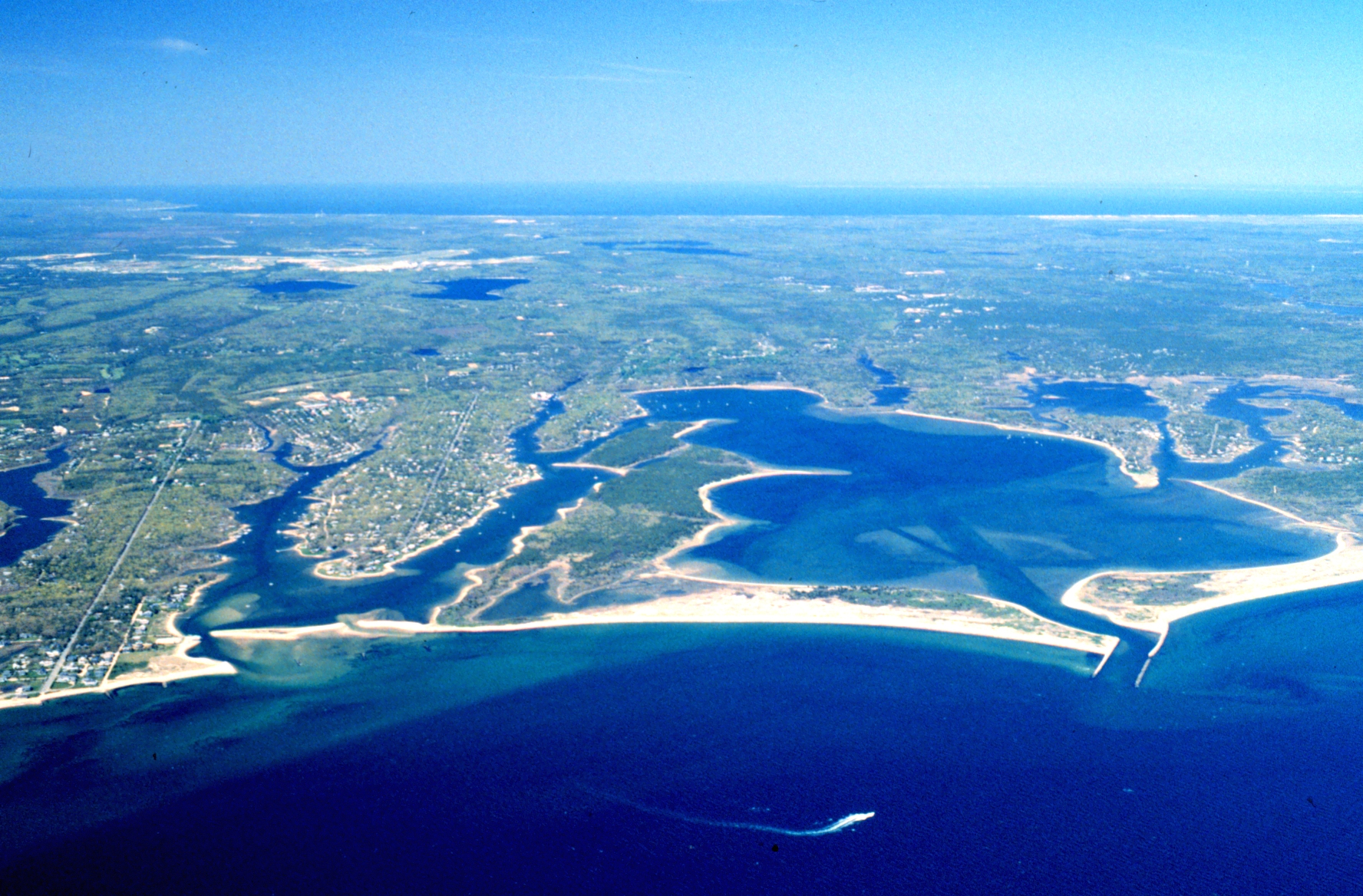
Estuaries

Estuaries occur where there is a noticeable change in salinity between saltwater and freshwater sources. This is typically found where rivers meet the ocean or sea. The wildlife found within estuaries is unique as the water in these areas is brackish - a mix of freshwater flowing to the ocean and salty seawater. Other types of estuaries also exist and have similar characteristics as traditional brackish estuaries. The Great Lakes are a prime example. There, river water mixes with lake water and creates freshwater estuaries. Estuaries are extremely productive ecosystems that many humans and animal species rely on for various activities. This can be seen as, of the 32 largest cities in the world, 22 are located on estuaries as they provide many environmental and economic benefits such as crucial habitat for many species, and being economic hubs for many coastal communities. Estuaries also provide essential ecosystem services such as water filtration, habitat protection, erosion control, gas regulation nutrient cycling, and it even gives education, recreation and tourism opportunities to people.

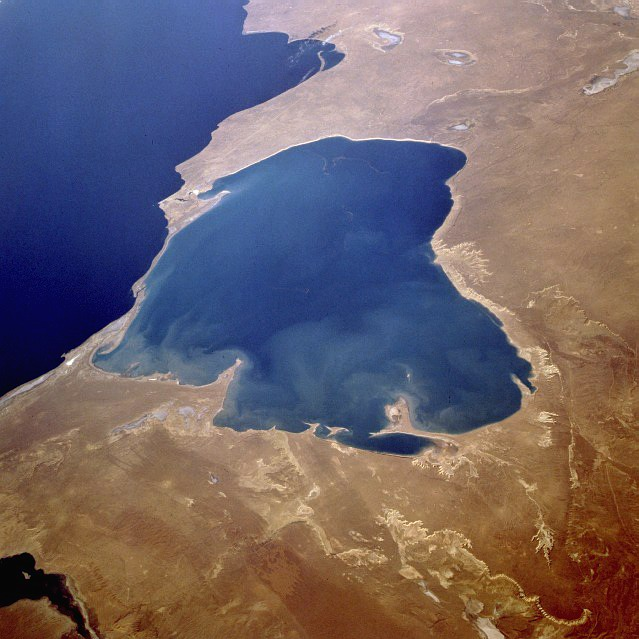
Lagoon

=== Lagoons ===
Lagoons are areas that are separated from larger water by natural barriers such as coral reefs or sandbars. There are two types of lagoons, coastal and oceanic/atoll lagoons. A coastal lagoon is, as the definition above, simply a body of water that is separated from the ocean by a barrier. An atoll lagoon is a circular coral reef or several coral islands that surround a lagoon. Atoll lagoons are often much deeper than coastal lagoons. Most lagoons are very shallow meaning that they are greatly affected by changed in precipitation, evaporation and wind. This means that salinity and temperature are widely varied in lagoons and that they can have water that ranges from fresh to hypersaline. Lagoons can be found in on coasts all over the world, on every continent except Antarctica and is an extremely diverse habitat being home to a wide array of species including birds, fish, crabs, plankton and more. Lagoons are also important to the economy as they provide a wide array of ecosystem services in addition to being the home of so many different species. Some of these services include fisheries, nutrient cycling, flood protection, water filtration, and even human tradition.

=== Reefs ===
==== Coral reefs ====
Coral reefs are one of the most well-known marine ecosystems in the world, with the largest being the Great Barrier Reef. These reefs are composed of large coral colonies of a variety of species living together. The corals from multiple symbiotic relationships with the organisms around them. Coral reefs are being heavily affected by global warming. They are one of the most vulnerable marine ecosystems. Due to marine heatwaves that have high warming levels coral reefs are at risk of a great decline, loss of its important structures, and exposure to higher frequency of marine heatwaves.

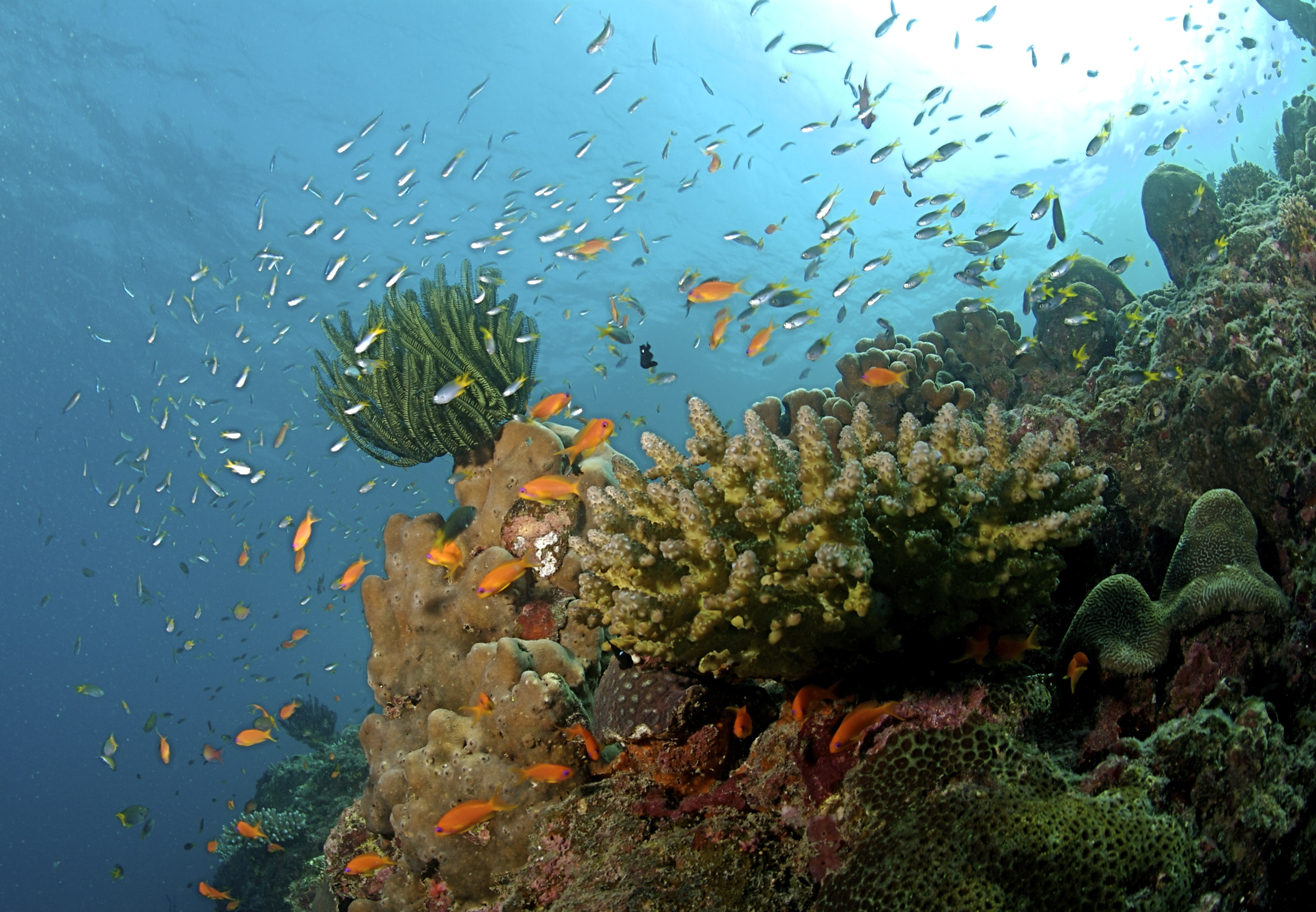
Coral reef

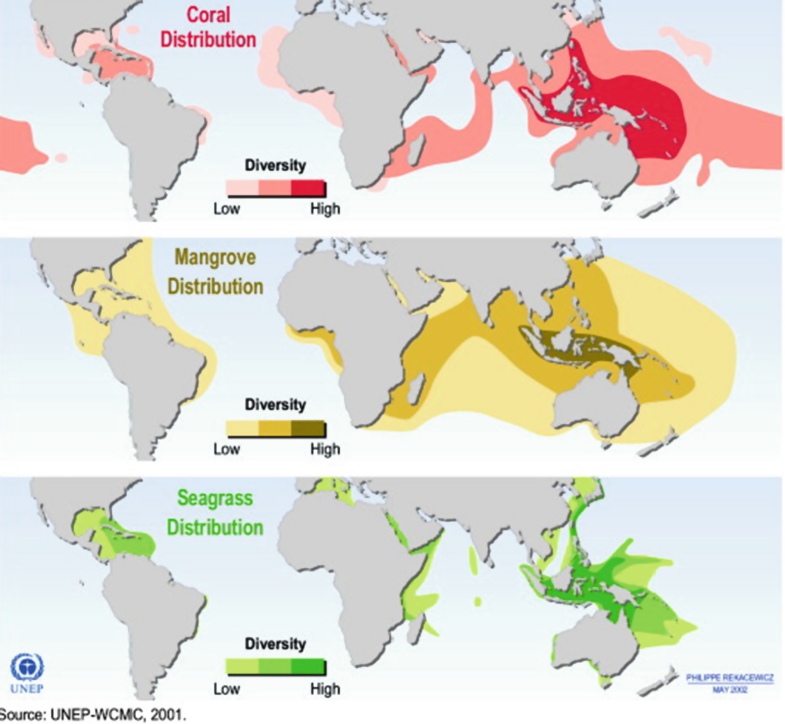
Global distribution of coral, mangrove, and seagrass diversity

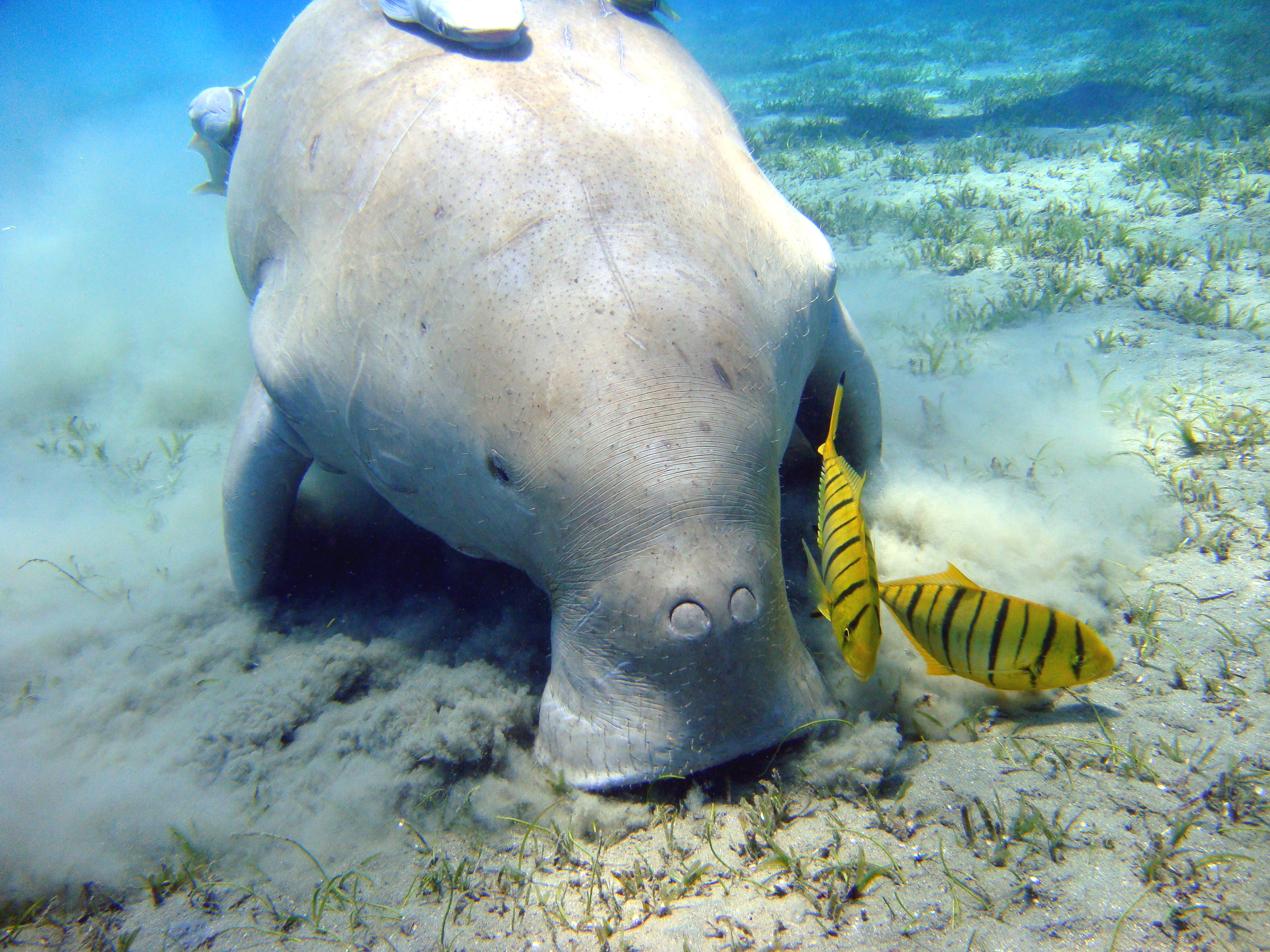
A shy but threatened dugong grazes a seagrass meadow, encouraging regrowth

==== Bivalve reefs ====
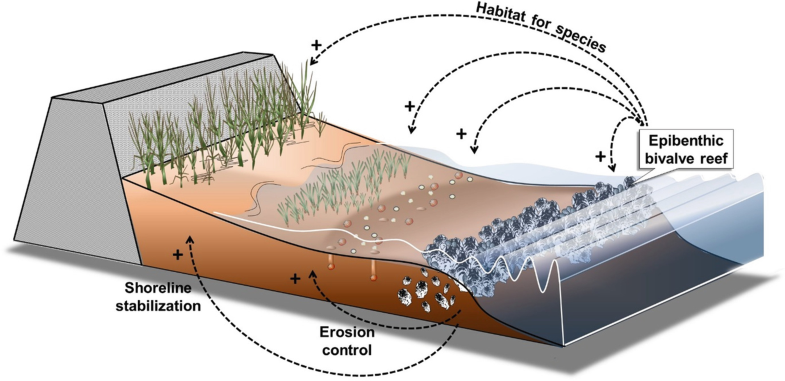
Ecosystem services delivered by epibenthic bivalve reefs

Bivalve reefs provide coastal protection through erosion control and shoreline stabilization, and modify the physical landscape by ecosystem engineering, thereby providing habitat for species by facilitative interactions with other habitats such as tidal flat benthic communities, seagrasses and marshes.

=== Vegetated ===
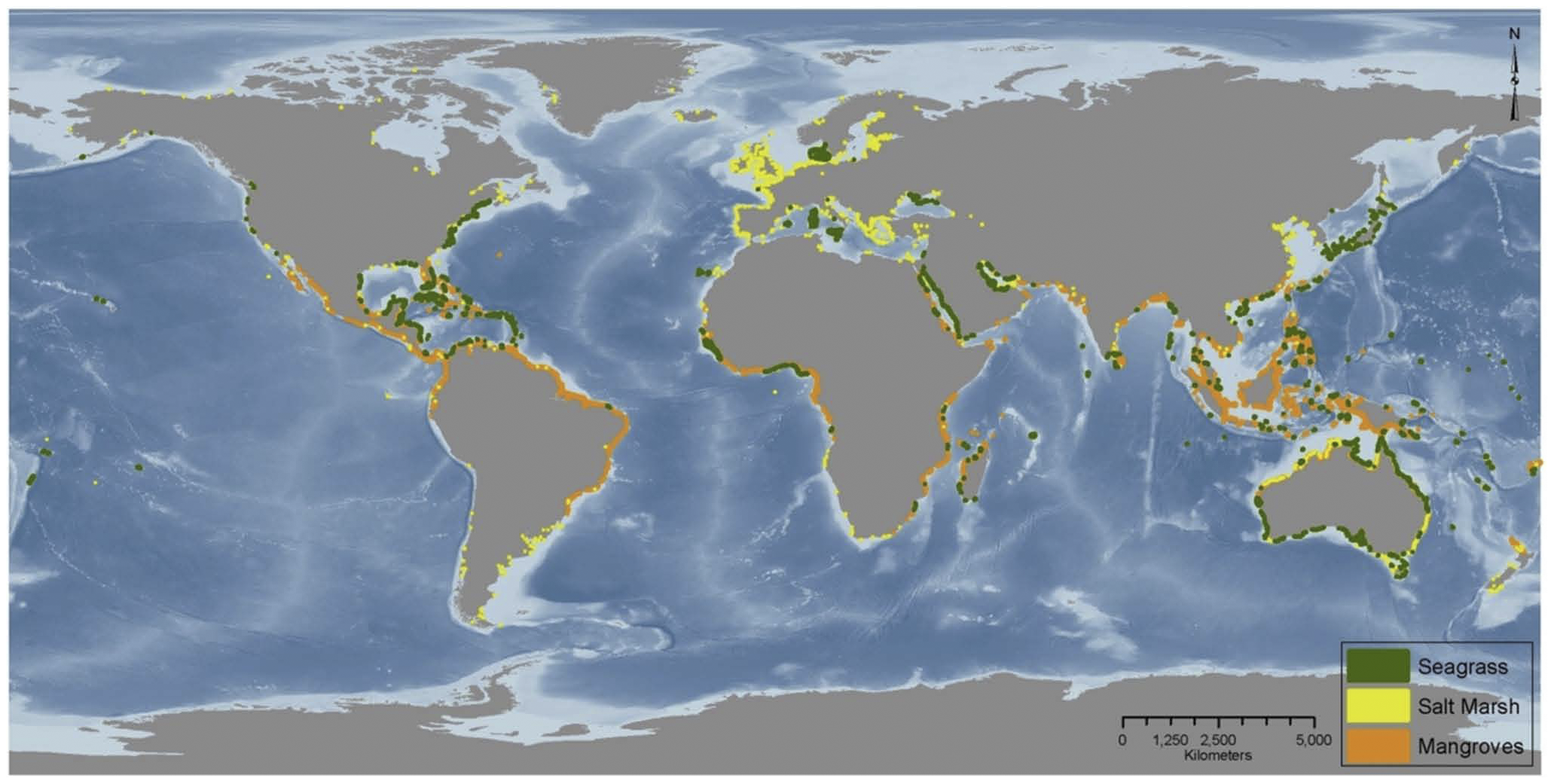
Global distribution of seagrasses, tidal marshes, and mangroves

Vegetated coastal ecosystems occur throughout the world, as illustrated in the diagram on the right. Seagrass beds are found from cold polar waters to the tropics. Mangrove forests are confined to tropical and sub-tropical areas, while tidal marshes are found in all regions, but most commonly in temperate areas. Combined, these ecosystems cover about 50 million hectares and provide a diverse array of ecosystem services such as fishery production, coastline protection, pollution buffering, as well as high rates of carbon sequestration.

Rapid loss of vegetated coastal ecosystems through land-use change has occurred for centuries, and has accelerated in recent decades. Causes of habitat conversion vary globally and include conversion to aquaculture, agriculture, forest over-exploitation, industrial use, upstream dams, dredging, eutrophication of overlying waters, urban development, and conversion to open water due to accelerated sea-level rise and subsidence.

Vegetated coastal ecosystems typically reside over organic-rich sediments that may be several meters deep and effectively lock up carbon due to low-oxygen conditions and other factors that inhibit decomposition at depth. These carbon stocks can exceed those of terrestrial ecosystems, including forests, by several times. When coastal habitats are degraded or converted to other land uses, the sediment carbon is destabilised or exposed to oxygen, and subsequent increased microbial activity releases large amounts of greenhouse gasses to the atmosphere or water column. The potential economic impacts that come from releasing stored coastal blue carbon to the atmosphere are felt worldwide. Economic impacts of greenhouse gas emissions in general stem from associated increases in droughts, sea level, and frequency of extreme weather events.

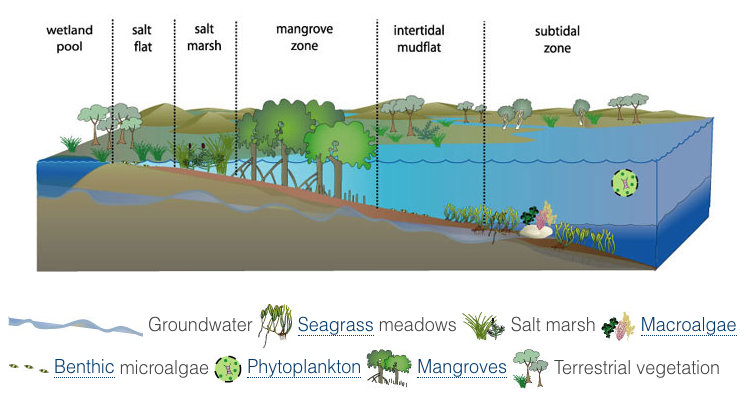
Conceptual diagram of estuarine vegetation

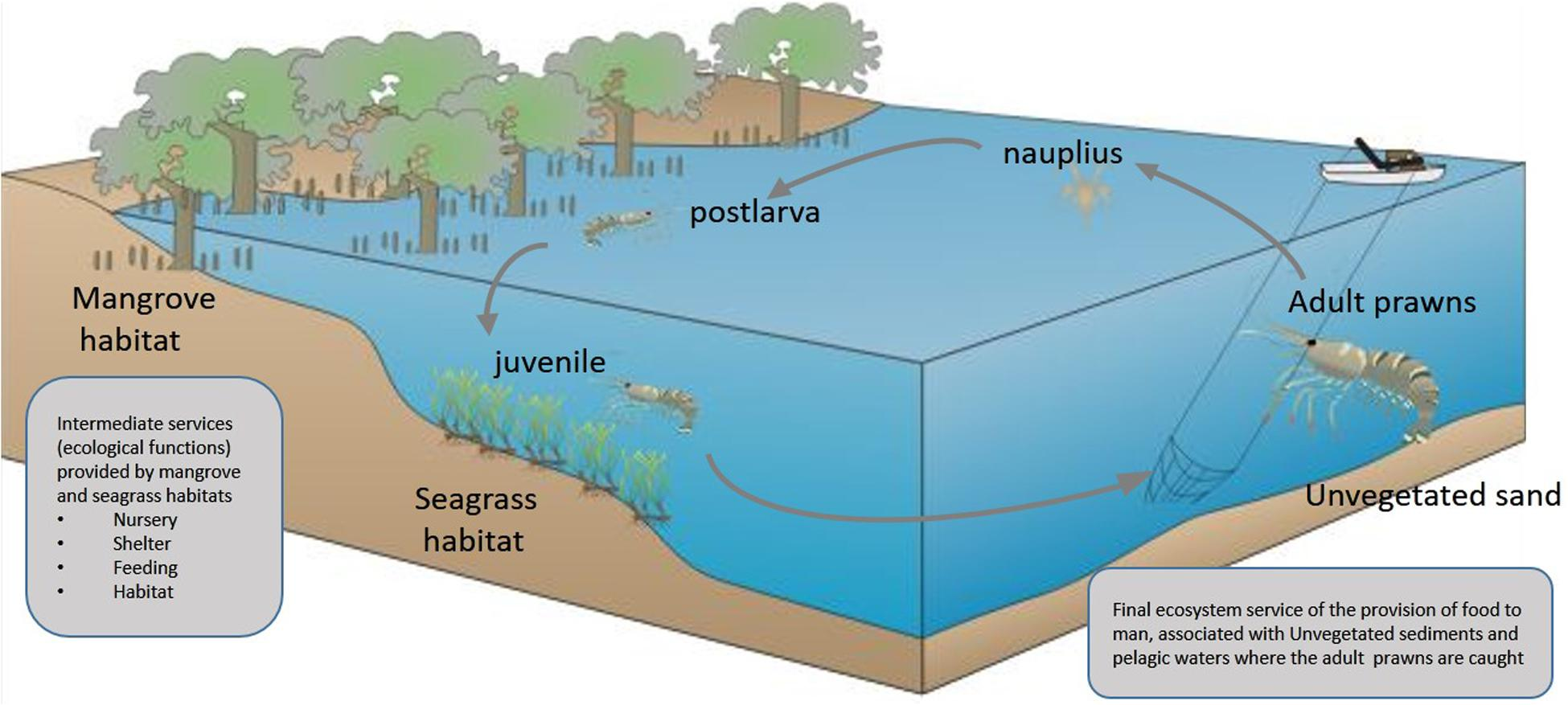
Ecosystem services provided by a vegetated coastal ecosystem. Diagram showing connectivity between a vegetated coastal ecosystem for the Penaeid prawn lifecycle indicating that valuations for harvest areas may overlook critical importance within the lifecycle.

==== Coastal wetlands ====
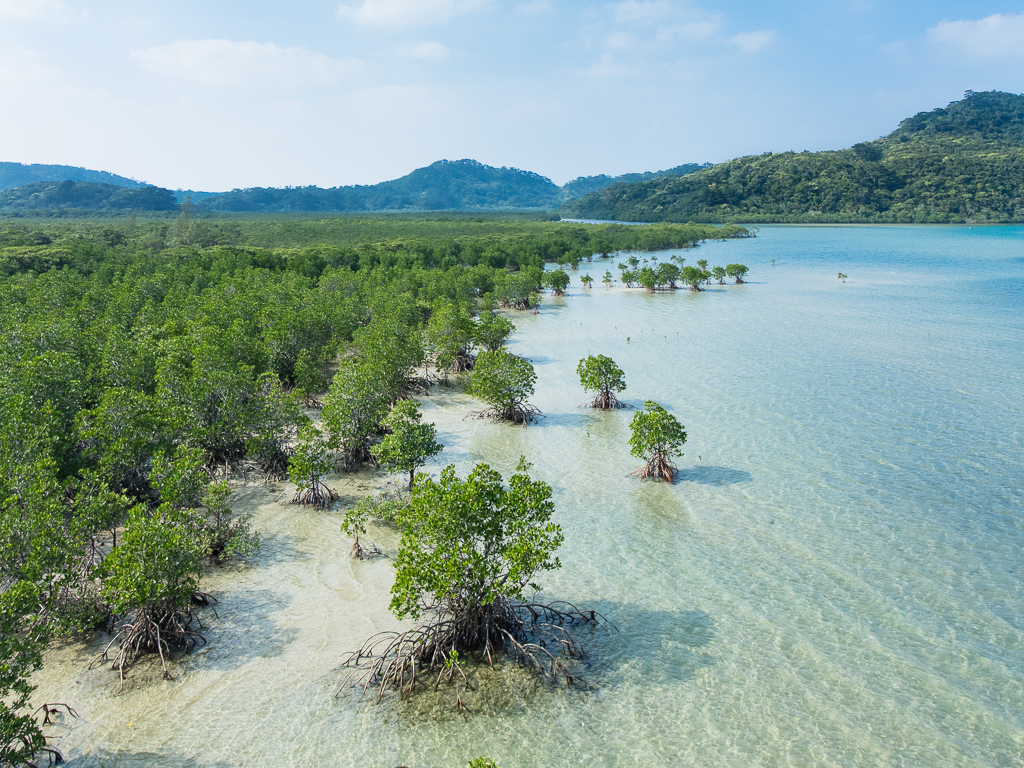
Mangrove forests

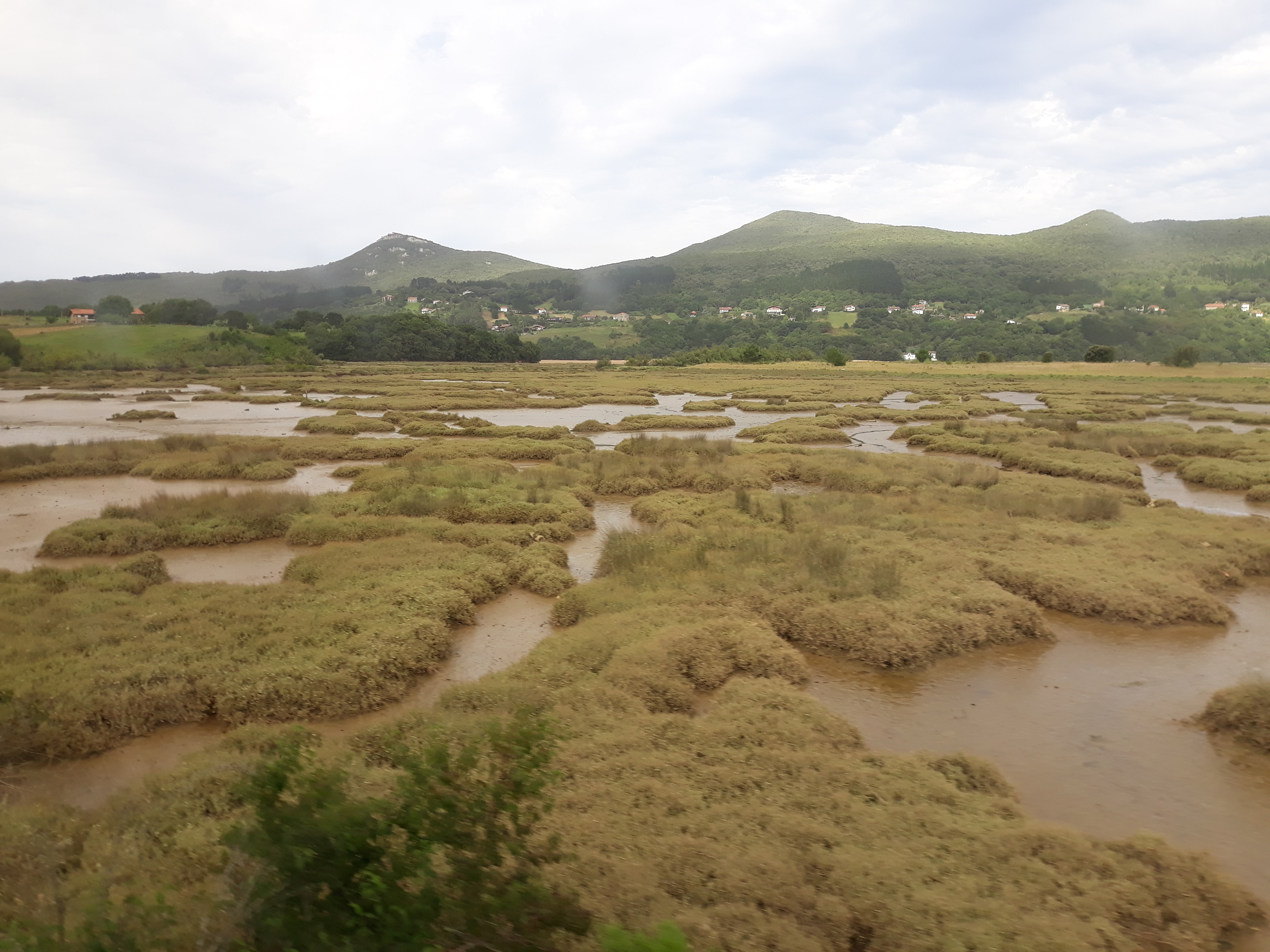
Salt marshes

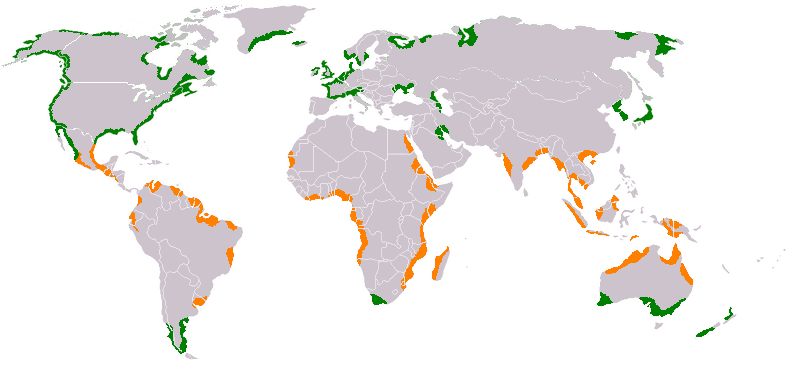
Mangroves dominate in tropical regions and salt marshes in temperate regions The presence of frost seems to control the demarcation – mangroves do not like frosts. mangroves dominate salt marshes dominate

Coastal wetlands are among the most productive ecosystems on Earth and generate vital services that benefit human societies around the world. Sediment-stabilization by wetlands such as salt marshes and mangroves serves to protect coastal communities from storm-waves, flooding, and land erosion. Coastal wetlands also reduce pollution from human waste, remove excess nutrients from the water column, trap pollutants, and sequester carbon. Further, near-shore wetlands act as both essential nursery habitats and feeding grounds for game fish, supporting a diverse group of economically important species.

===== Mangrove forests =====
Mangroves are trees or shrubs that grow in low-oxygen soil near coastlines in tropical or subtropical latitudes. They are an extremely productive and complex ecosystem that connects the land and sea. Mangroves consist of species that are not necessarily related to each other and are often grouped for the characteristics they share rather than genetic similarity. Because of their proximity to the coast, they have all developed adaptions such as salt excretion and root aeration to live in salty, oxygen-depleted water. Mangroves can often be recognized by their dense tangle of roots that act to protect the coast by reducing erosion from storm surges, currents, wave, and tides. The mangrove ecosystem is also an important source of food for many species as well as excellent at sequestering carbon dioxide from the atmosphere with global mangrove carbon storage is estimated at 34 million metric tons per year.

===== Salt marshes =====
Salt marshes are a transition from the ocean to the land, where fresh and saltwater mix. The soil in these marshes is often made up of mud and a layer of organic material called peat. Peat is characterized as waterlogged and root-filled decomposing plant matter that often causes low oxygen levels (hypoxia). These hypoxic conditions causes growth of the bacteria that also gives salt marshes the sulfurous smell they are often known for. Salt marshes exist around the world and are needed for healthy ecosystems and a healthy economy. They are extremely productive ecosystems and they provide essential services for more than 75 percent of fishery species and protect shorelines from erosion and flooding. Salt marshes can be generally divided into the high marsh, low marsh, and the upland border. The low marsh is closer to the ocean, with it being flooded at nearly every tide except low tide. The high marsh is located between the low marsh and the upland border and it usually only flooded when higher than usual tides are present. The upland border is the freshwater edge of the marsh and is usually located at elevations slightly higher than the high marsh. This region is usually only flooded under extreme weather conditions and experiences much less waterlogged conditions and salt stress than other areas of the marsh.

==== Seagrass meadows ====
Seagrasses form dense underwater meadows which are among the most productive ecosystems in the world. They provide habitats and food for a diversity of marine life comparable to coral reefs. This includes invertebrates like shrimp and crabs, cod and flatfish, marine mammals and birds. They provide refuges for endangered species such as seahorses, turtles, and dugongs. They function as nursery habitats for shrimps, scallops and many commercial fish species. Seagrass meadows provide coastal storm protection by the way their leaves absorb energy from waves as they hit the coast. They keep coastal waters healthy by absorbing bacteria and nutrients, and slow the speed of climate change by sequestering carbon dioxide into the sediment of the ocean floor.

Seagrasses evolved from marine algae which colonized land and became land plants, and then returned to the ocean about 100 million years ago. However, today seagrass meadows are being damaged by human activities such as pollution from land runoff, fishing boats that drag dredges or trawls across the meadows uprooting the grass, and overfishing which unbalances the ecosystem. Seagrass meadows are currently being destroyed at a rate of about two football fields every hour.

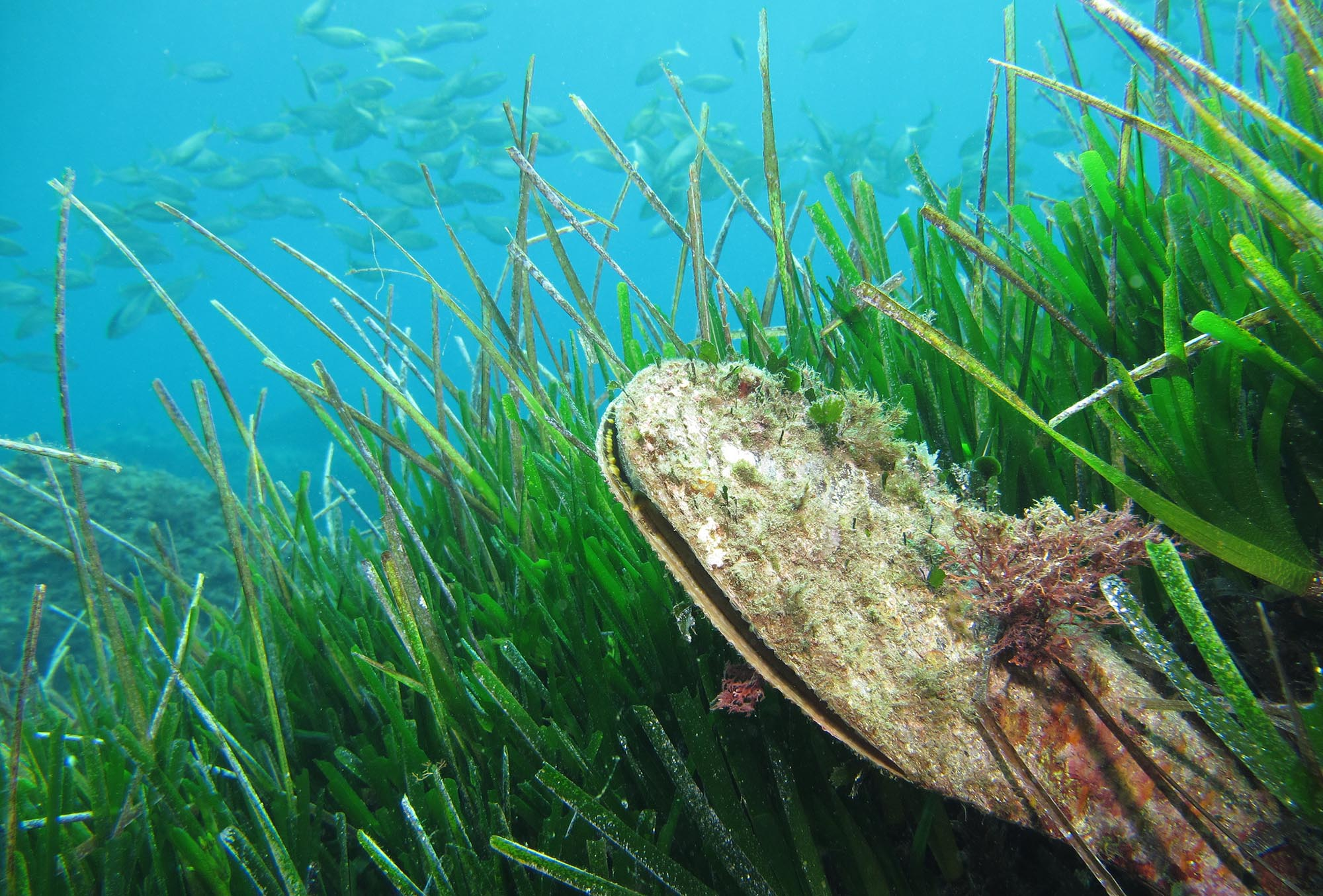
Seagrass meadow

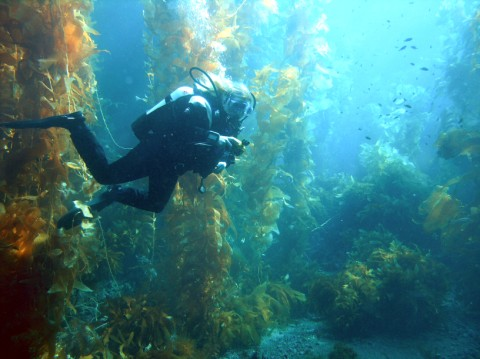
Kelp forest

External videos
- Seagrasses and mangroves – YouTube
- Salt marshes versus the sea – Cambridge University
- Salt marshes: Nature's guardians of the coast – YouTube
- David Attenborough: Save magical kelp forests - BBC

==== Kelp forests ====
Kelp forests occur worldwide throughout temperate and polar coastal oceans. In 2007, kelp forests were also discovered in tropical waters near Ecuador.

Physically formed by brown macroalgae, kelp forests provide a unique habitat for marine organisms and are a source for understanding many ecological processes. Over the last century, they have been the focus of extensive research, particularly in trophic ecology, and continue to provoke important ideas that are relevant beyond this unique ecosystem. For example, kelp forests can influence coastal oceanographic patterns and provide many ecosystem services.

However, the influence of humans has often contributed to kelp forest degradation. Of particular concern are the effects of overfishing nearshore ecosystems, which can release herbivores from their normal population regulation and result in the overgrazing of kelp and other algae. This can rapidly result in transitions to barren landscapes where relatively few species persist. Already due to the combined effects of overfishing and climate change, kelp forests have all but disappeared in many especially vulnerable places, such as Tasmania's east coast and the coast of Northern California. The implementation of marine protected areas is one management strategy useful for addressing such issues, since it may limit the impacts of fishing and buffer the ecosystem from additive effects of other environmental stressors.

== Coastal ecology ==
=== Coastal food webs ===
External videos
- Our Planet: Coastal Seas – David Attenborough, full episode, Netflix

Coastal waters include the waters in estuaries and over continental shelves. They occupy about 8 percent of the total ocean area and account for about half of all the ocean productivity. The key nutrients determining eutrophication are nitrogen in coastal waters and phosphorus in lakes. Both are found in high concentrations in guano (seabird feces), which acts as a fertilizer for the surrounding ocean or an adjacent lake. Uric acid is the dominant nitrogen compound, and during its mineralization different nitrogen forms are produced.

Ecosystems, even those with seemingly distinct borders, rarely function independently of other adjacent systems. Ecologists are increasingly recognizing the important effects that cross-ecosystem transport of energy and nutrients have on plant and animal populations and communities. A well known example of this is how seabirds concentrate marine-derived nutrients on breeding islands in the form of feces (guano) which contains ~15–20% nitrogen (N), as well as 10% phosphorus. These nutrients dramatically alter terrestrial ecosystem functioning and dynamics and can support increased primary and secondary productivity. However, although many studies have demonstrated nitrogen enrichment of terrestrial components due to guano deposition across various taxonomic groups, only a few have studied its retroaction on marine ecosystems and most of these studies were restricted to temperate regions and high nutrient waters. In the tropics, coral reefs can be found adjacent to islands with large populations of breeding seabirds, and could be potentially affected by local nutrient enrichment due to the transport of seabird-derived nutrients in surrounding waters. Studies on the influence of guano on tropical marine ecosystems suggest nitrogen from guano enriches seawater and reef primary producers.

Reef building corals have essential nitrogen needs and, thriving in nutrient-poor tropical waters where nitrogen is a major limiting nutrient for primary productivity, they have developed specific adaptations for conserving this element. Their establishment and maintenance are partly due to their symbiosis with unicellular dinoflagellates, Symbiodinium spp. (zooxanthellae), that can take up and retain dissolved inorganic nitrogen (ammonium and nitrate) from the surrounding waters. These zooxanthellae can also recycle the animal wastes and subsequently transfer them back to the coral host as amino acids, ammonium or urea. Corals are also able to ingest nitrogen-rich sediment particles and plankton. Coastal eutrophication and excess nutrient supply can have strong impacts on corals, leading to a decrease in skeletal growth,

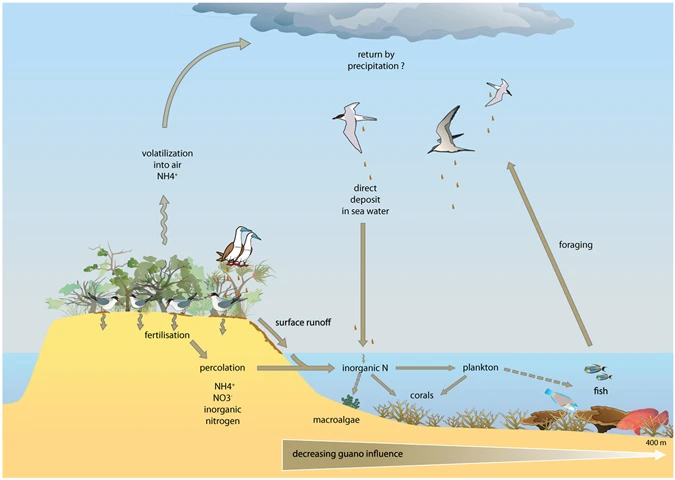
Pathways for guano-derived nitrogen to enter marine food webs

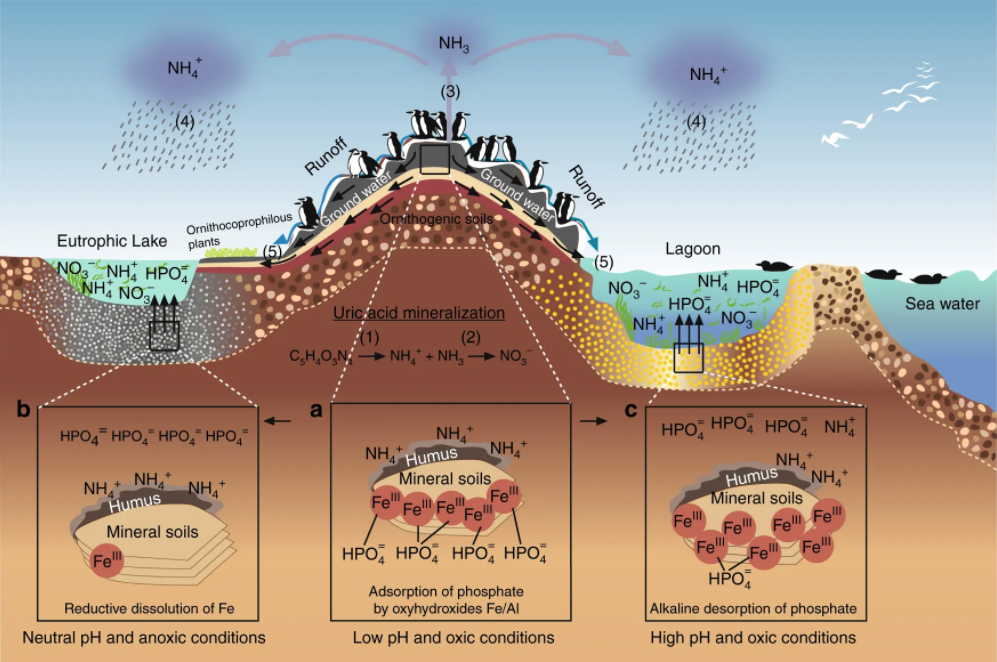
Seabird colonies are nutrient hot spots, especially, for nitrogen and phosphorus

=== Coastal predators ===
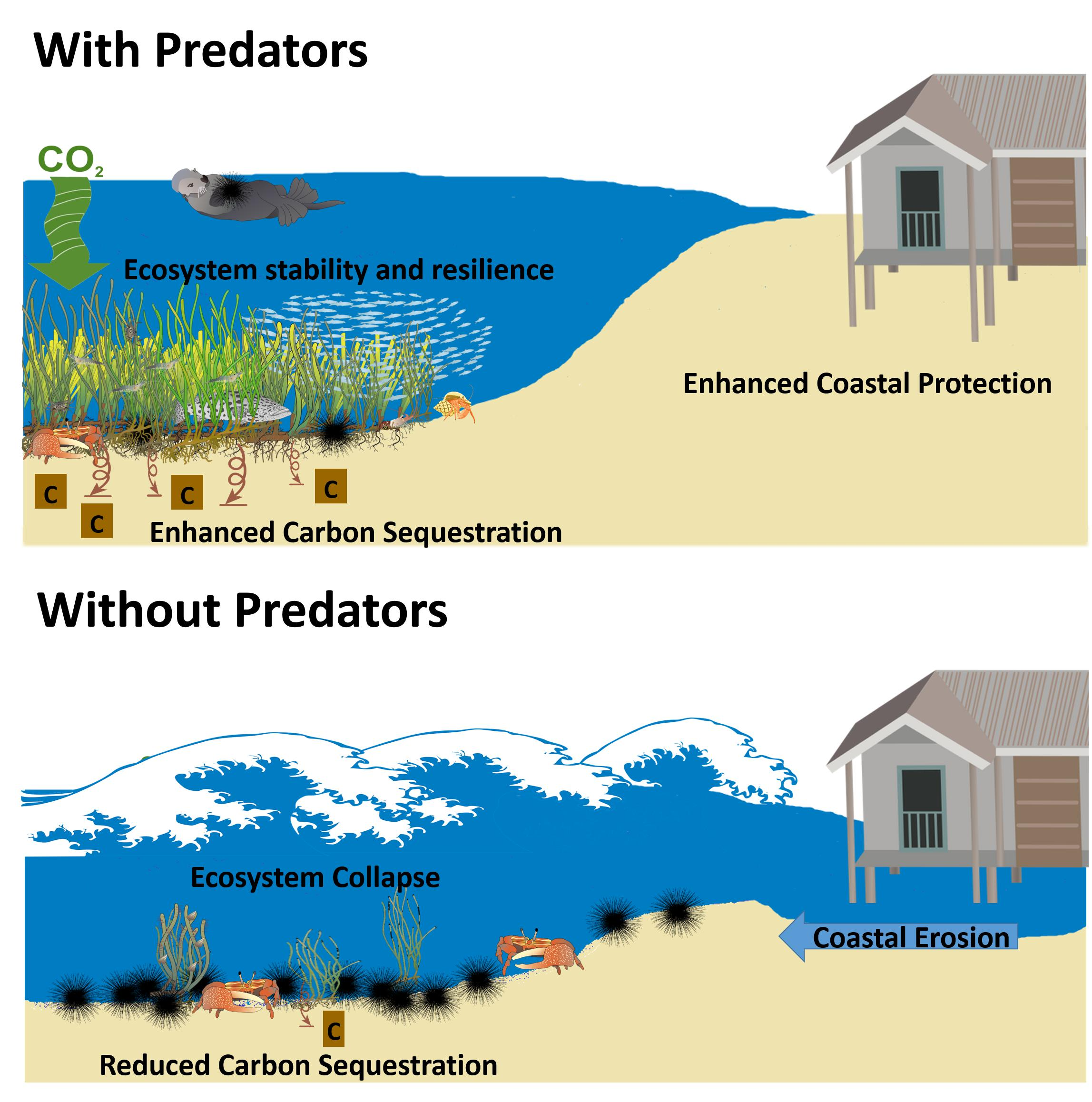
Predicted effects of predators, or lack of predators, on ecosystem services (carbon sequestration, coastal protection, and ecosystem stability) in coastal plant communities. It is predicted that predators, through direct and indirect interactions with lower trophic levels, support increased carbon uptake in plants and soils, protect coasts from storm surges and flooding, and support stability and resistance.

Food web theory predicts that current global declines in marine predators could generate unwanted consequences for many marine ecosystems. In coastal plant communities, such as kelp, seagrass meadows, mangrove forests and salt marshes, several studies have documented the far-reaching effects of changing predator populations. Across coastal ecosystems, the loss of marine predators appears to negatively affect coastal plant communities and the ecosystem services they provide.

The green world hypothesis predicts loss of predator control on herbivores could result in runaway consumption that would eventually denude a landscape or seascape of vegetation. Since the inception of the green world hypothesis, ecologists have tried to understand the prevalence of indirect and alternating effects of predators on lower trophic levels (trophic cascades), and their overall impact on ecosystems. Multiple lines of evidence now suggest that top predators are key to the persistence of some ecosystems.

With an estimated habitat loss greater than 50 percent, coastal plant communities are among the world's most endangered ecosystems. As bleak as this number is, the predators that patrol coastal systems have fared far worse. Several predatory taxa including species of marine mammals, elasmobranchs, and seabirds have declined by 90 to 100 percent compared to historical populations. Predator declines pre-date habitat declines, suggesting alterations to predator populations may be a major driver of change for coastal systems.

There is little doubt that collapsing marine predator populations results from overharvesting by humans. Localized declines and extinctions of coastal predators by humans began over 40,000 years ago with subsistence harvesting. However, for most large bodied, marine predators (toothed whales, large pelagic fish, sea birds, pinnipeds, and otters) the beginning of their sharp global declines occurred over the last century, coinciding with the expansion of coastal human populations and advances in industrial fishing. Following global declines in marine predators, evidence of trophic cascades in coastal ecosystems started to emerge, with the disturbing realisation that they affected more than just populations of lower trophic levels.

Understanding the importance of predators in coastal plant communities has been bolstered by their documented ability to influence ecosystem services. Multiple examples have shown that changes to the strength or direction of predator effects on lower trophic levels can influence coastal erosion, carbon sequestration, and ecosystem resilience. The idea that the extirpation of predators can have far-reaching effects on the persistence of coastal plants and their ecosystem services has become a major motivation for their conservation in coastal systems.

=== Seascape ecology ===
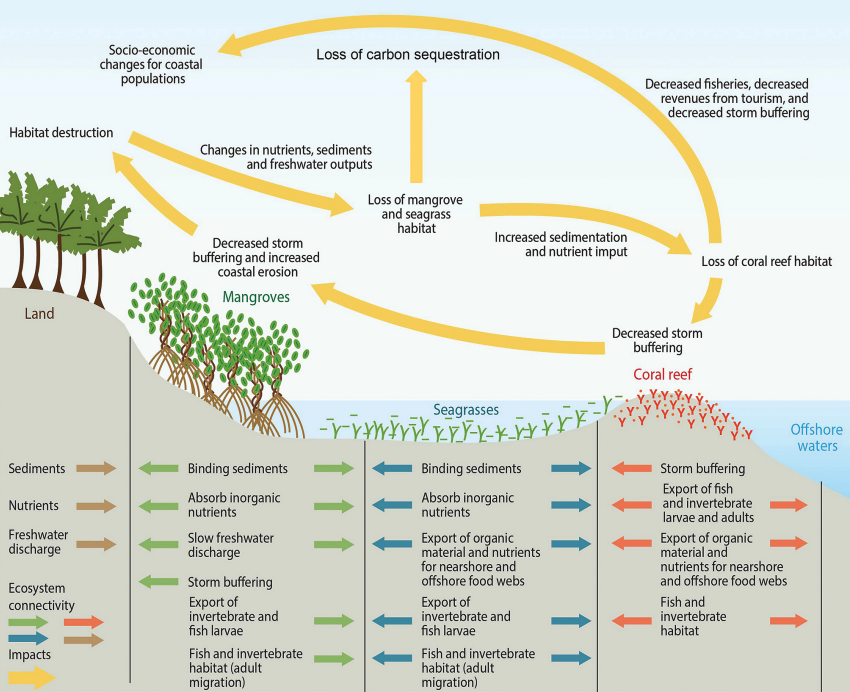
Example of seascape connectivity among different patch types in a tropical seascape and the flow of ecosystem services. Ecological linkages are depicted by arrows: terrestrial (brown); mangroves (green); seagrasses (blue); and coral reefs (red). Potential feedbacks from human impacts are also shown (yellow arrows).

Seascape ecology is the marine and coastal version of landscape ecology. It is currently emerging as an interdisciplinary and spatially explicit ecological science with relevance to marine management, biodiversity conservation, and restoration. Seascapes are complex ocean spaces, shaped by dynamic and interconnected patterns and processes operating across a range of spatial and temporal scales. Rapid advances in geospatial technologies and the proliferation of sensors, both above and below the ocean surface, have revealed intricate and scientifically intriguing ecological patterns and processes, some of which are the result of human activities. Despite progress in the collecting, mapping, and sharing of ocean data, the gap between technological advances and the ability to generate ecological insights for marine management and conservation practice remains substantial. For instance, fundamental gaps exist in the understanding of multidimensional spatial structure in the sea, and the implications for planetary health and human wellbeing. Deeper understanding of the multi-scale linkages between ecological structure, function, and change will better support the design of whole-system strategies for biodiversity preservation and reduce uncertainty around the consequences of human activity. For example, in the design and evaluation of marine protected areas (MPAs) and habitat restoration, it is important to understand the influence of spatial context, configuration, and connectivity, and to consider effects of scale.

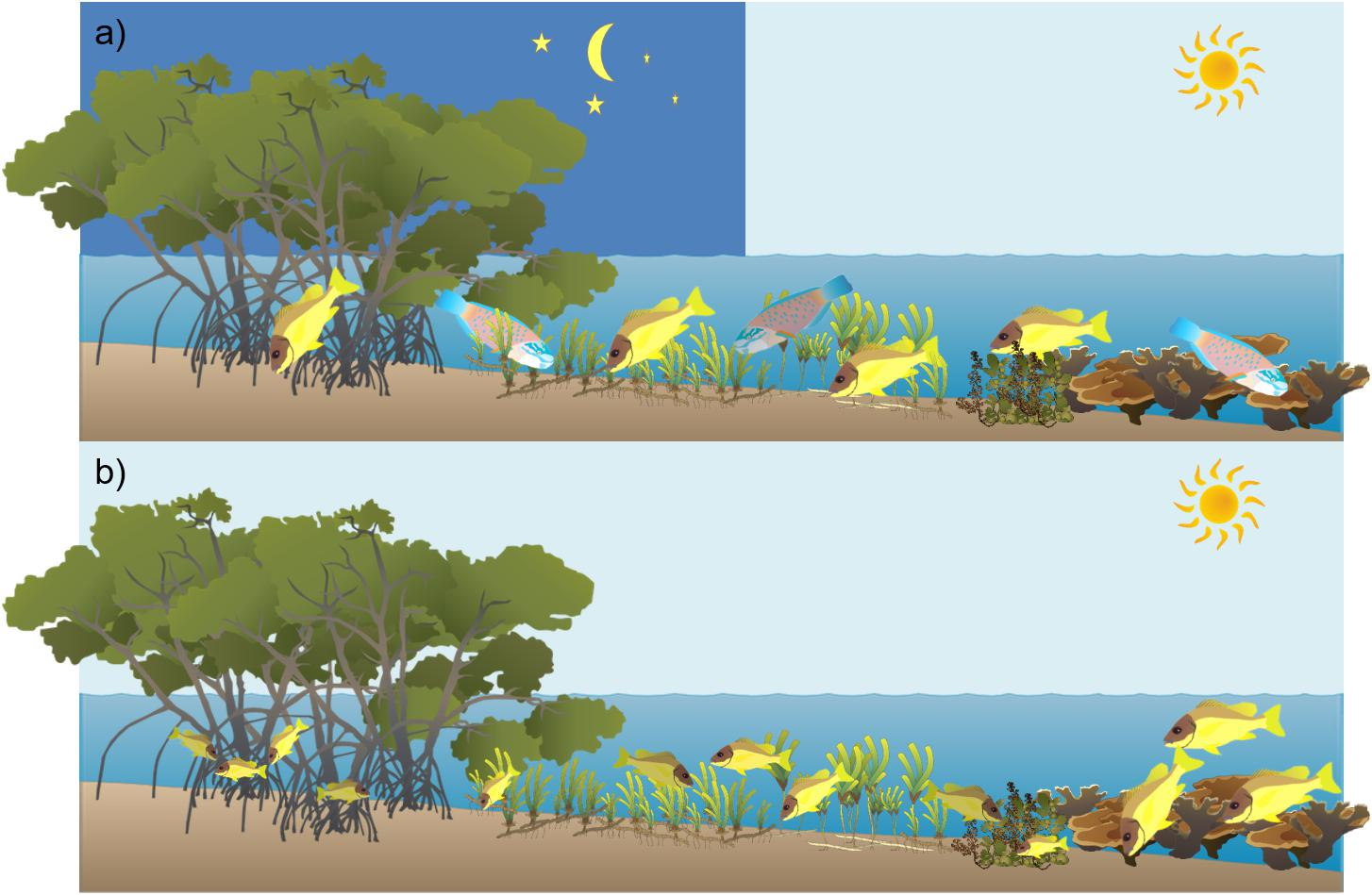
Fish migrations between coral reef, macroalgae, seagrass and mangrove habitats: (a) diel and tidal foraging migrations, (b) ontogenetic migration of juvenile coral reef fish.

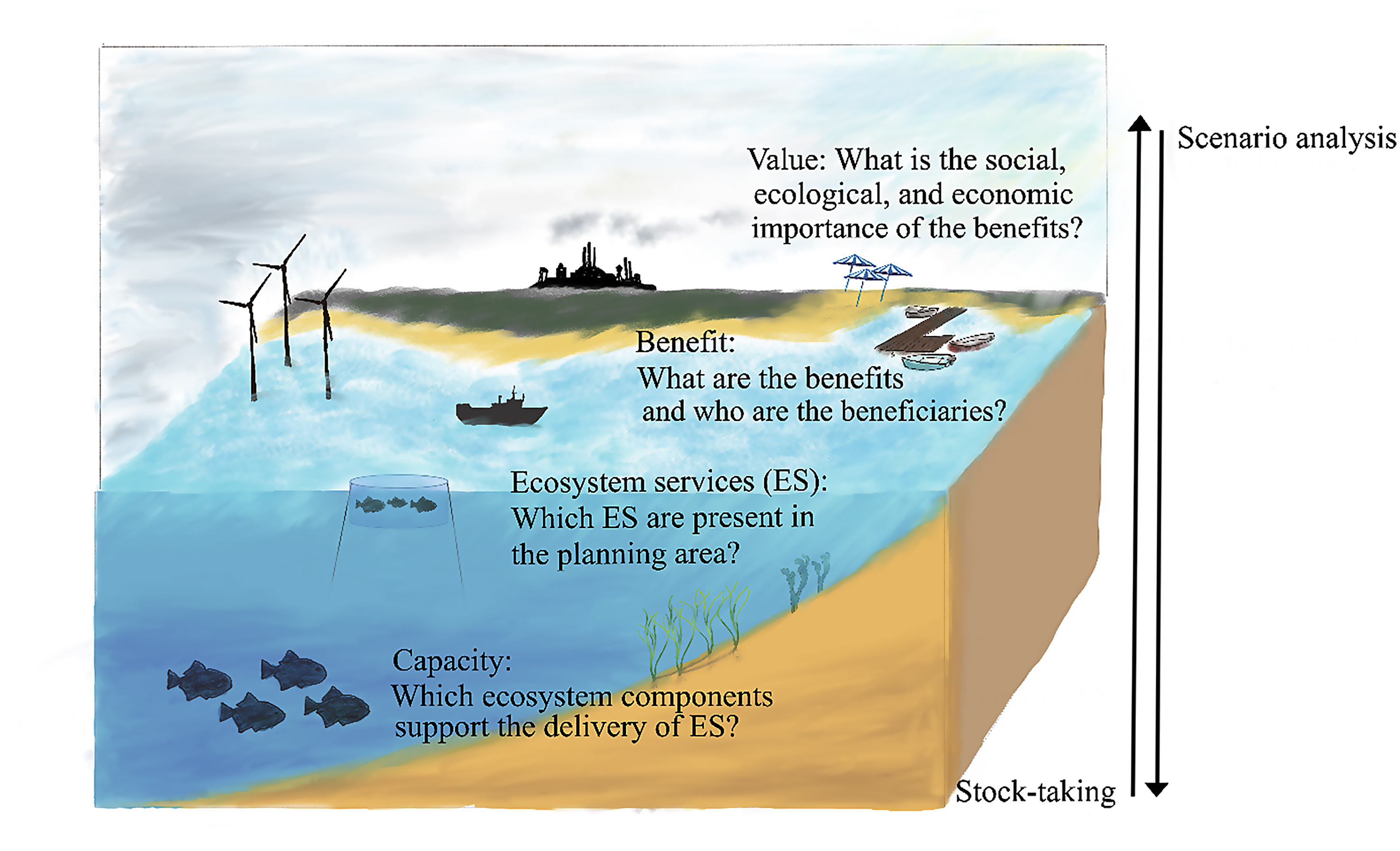
The ecosystem cascade to structure the stock-taking and scenario analysis steps in the marine spatial planning process.

=== Interactions between ecosystems ===
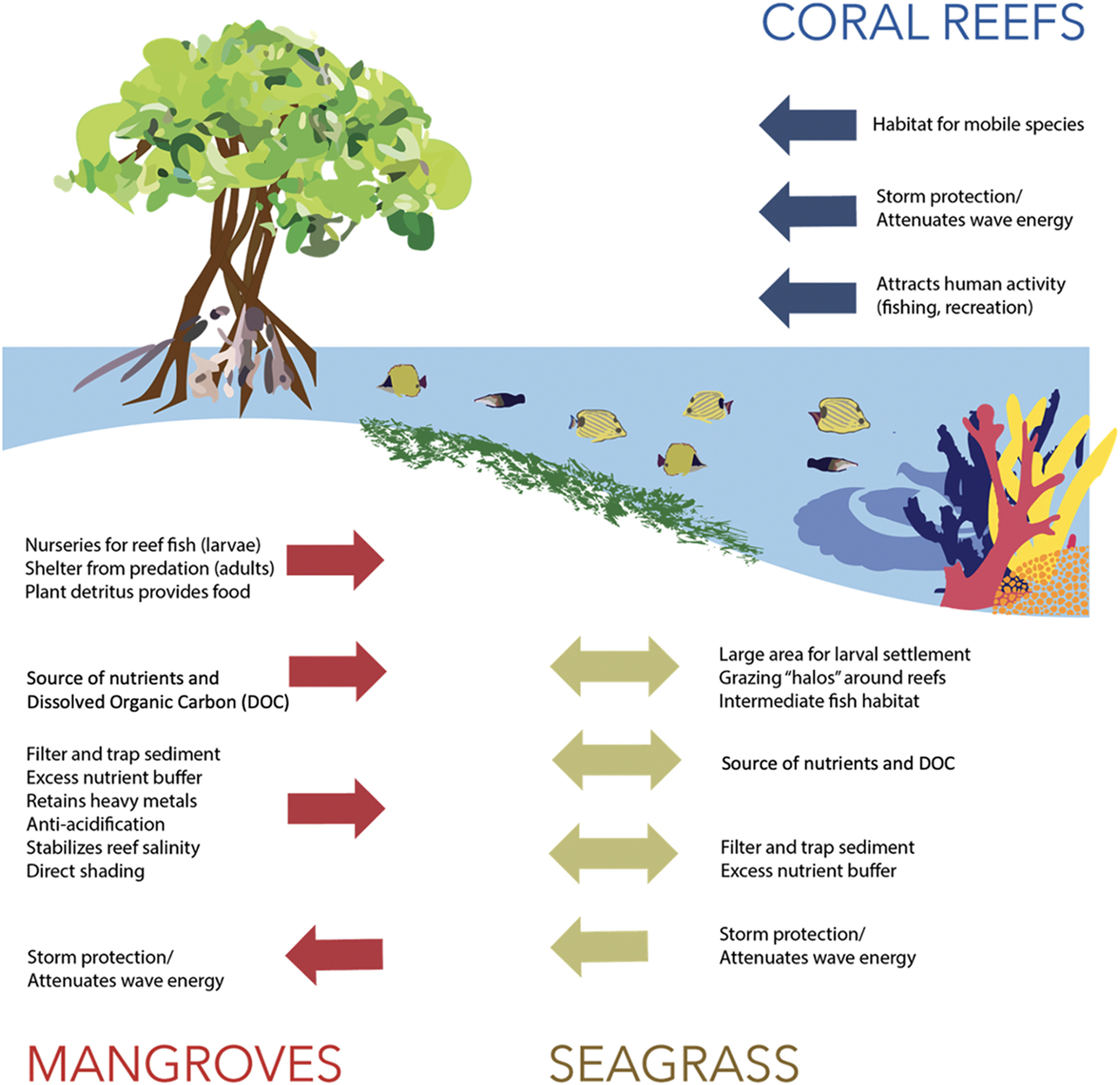
Principal interactions between mangroves, seagrass, and coral reefs

The diagram on the right shows the principal interactions between mangroves, seagrass, and coral reefs. Coral reefs, seagrasses, and mangroves buffer habitats further inland from storms and wave damage as well as participate in a tri-system exchange of mobile fish and invertebrates. Mangroves and seagrasses are critical in regulating sediment, freshwater, and nutrient flows to coral reefs.

The diagram immediately below shows locations where mangroves, coral reefs, and seagrass beds exist within one km of each other. Buffered intersection between the three systems provides relative co-occurrence rates on a global scale. Regions where systems strongly intersect include Central America (Belize), the Caribbean, the Red Sea, the Coral Triangle (particularly Malaysia), Madagascar, and the Great Barrier Reef.

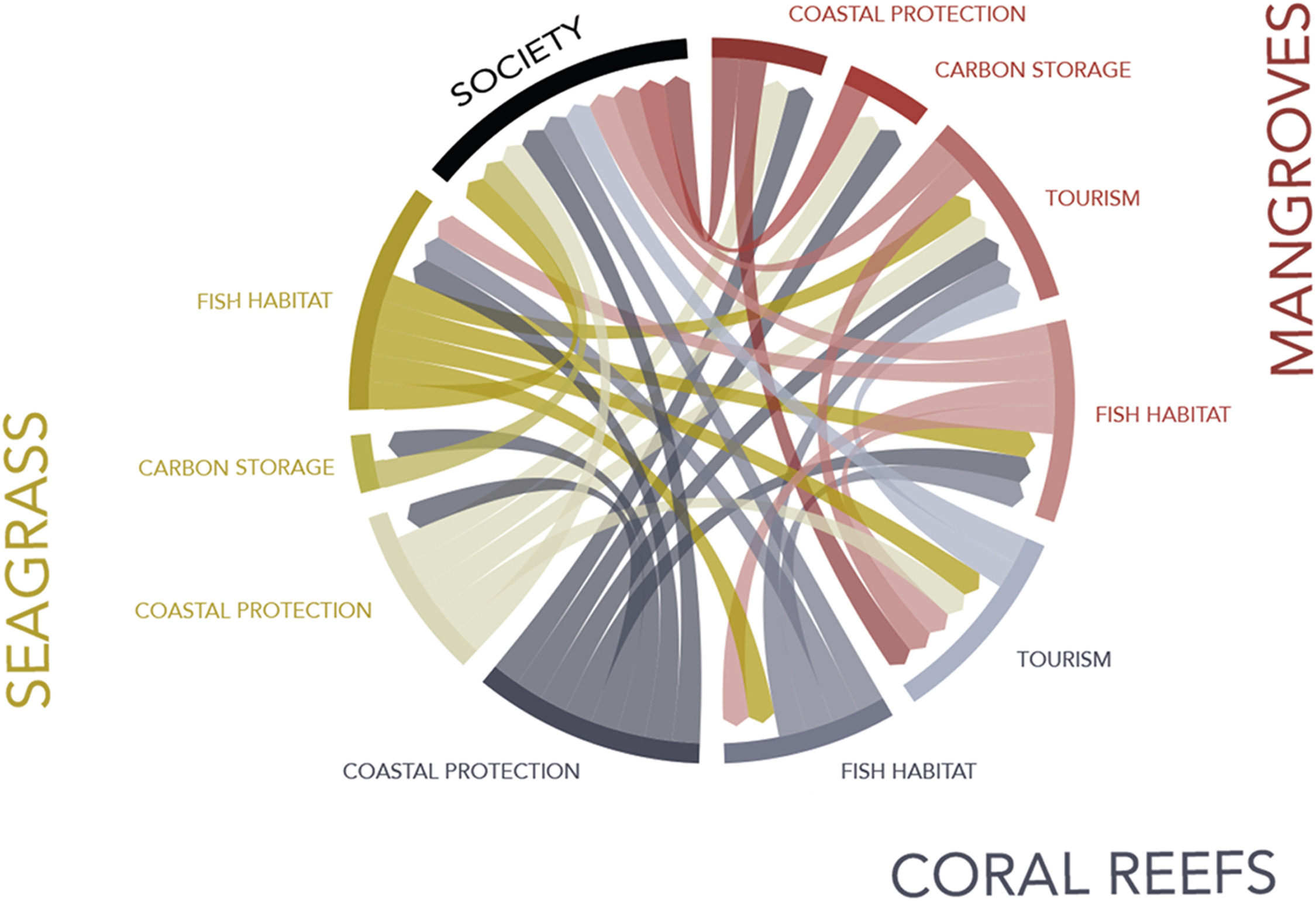
Ecosystem service synergies between mangroves, seagrasses, and coral reefs

The diagram at the right graphically illustrates the ecosystem service synergies between mangroves, seagrasses, and coral reefs. The ecosystem services provided by intact reefs, seagrasses, and mangroves are both highly valuable and mutually enhance each other. Coastal protection (storm/wave attenuation) maintains the structure of adjacent ecosystems, and associated ecosystem services, in an offshore-to-onshore direction. Fisheries are characterized by migratory species, and therefore, protecting fisheries in one ecosystem increases fish biomass in others. Tourism benefits from coastal protection and healthy fisheries from multiple ecosystems. Here, we do not draw within-ecosystem connections in order to better emphasise synergies between systems.

=== Network ecology ===
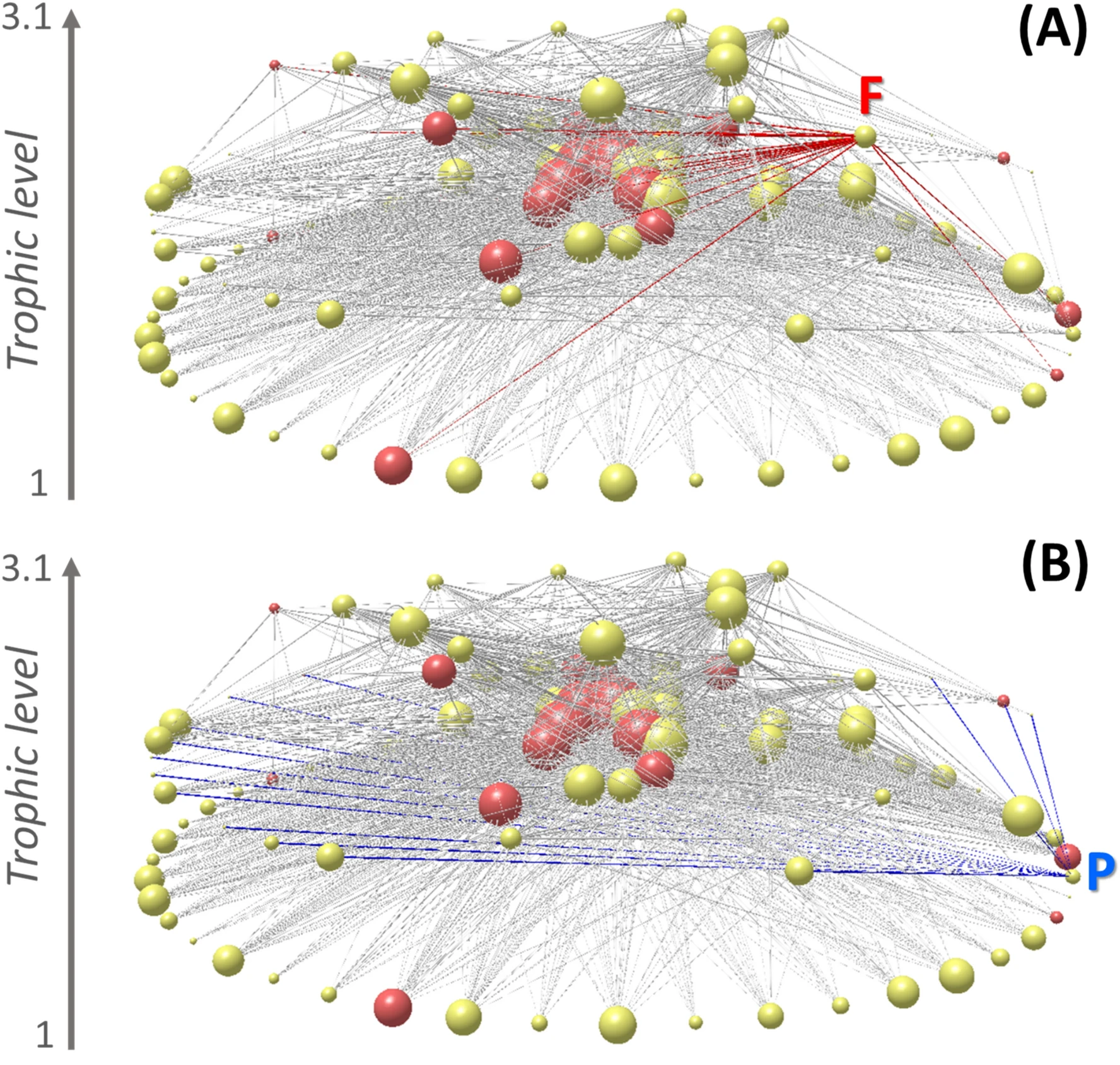
Intertidal food web highlighting nodes and links of (A) artisanal fisheries and (B) plankton

To compound things, removal of biomass from the ocean occurs simultaneously with multiple other stressors associated to climate change that compromise the capacity of these socio-ecological systems to respond to perturbations. Besides sea surface temperature, climate change also affects many other physical–chemical characteristics of marine coastal waters (stratification, acidification, ventilation) as well as the wind regimes that control surface water productivity along the productive coastal upwelling ecosystems. Changes in the productivity of the oceans are reflected in changes of plankton biomass. Plankton contributes approximately half of the global primary production, supports marine food webs, influences the biogeochemical process in the ocean, and strongly affects commercial fisheries. Indeed, an overall decrease in marine plankton productivity is expected over global scales. Long-term increases and decreases in plankton productivity have already occurred over the past two decades along extensive regions of the Humboldt upwelling ecosystem off Chile, and are expected to propagate up the pelagic and benthic food webs.

Network ecology has advanced understanding of ecosystems by providing a powerful framework to analyse biological communities. Previous studies used this framework to assess food web robustness against species extinctions, defined as the fraction of initial species that remain present in the ecosystem after a primary extinction. These studies showed the importance for food web persistence of highly connected species (independent of trophic position), basal species, and highly connected species that, at the same time, trophically support other highly connected species. Most of these studies used a static approach, which stems from network theory and analyzes the impacts of structural changes on food webs represented by nodes (species) and links (interactions) that connect nodes, but ignores interaction strengths and population dynamics of interacting species. Other studies used a dynamic approach, which considers not only the structure and intensity of interactions in a food web, but also the changes in species biomasses through time and the indirect effects that these changes have on other species.

== Coastal biogeochemistry ==
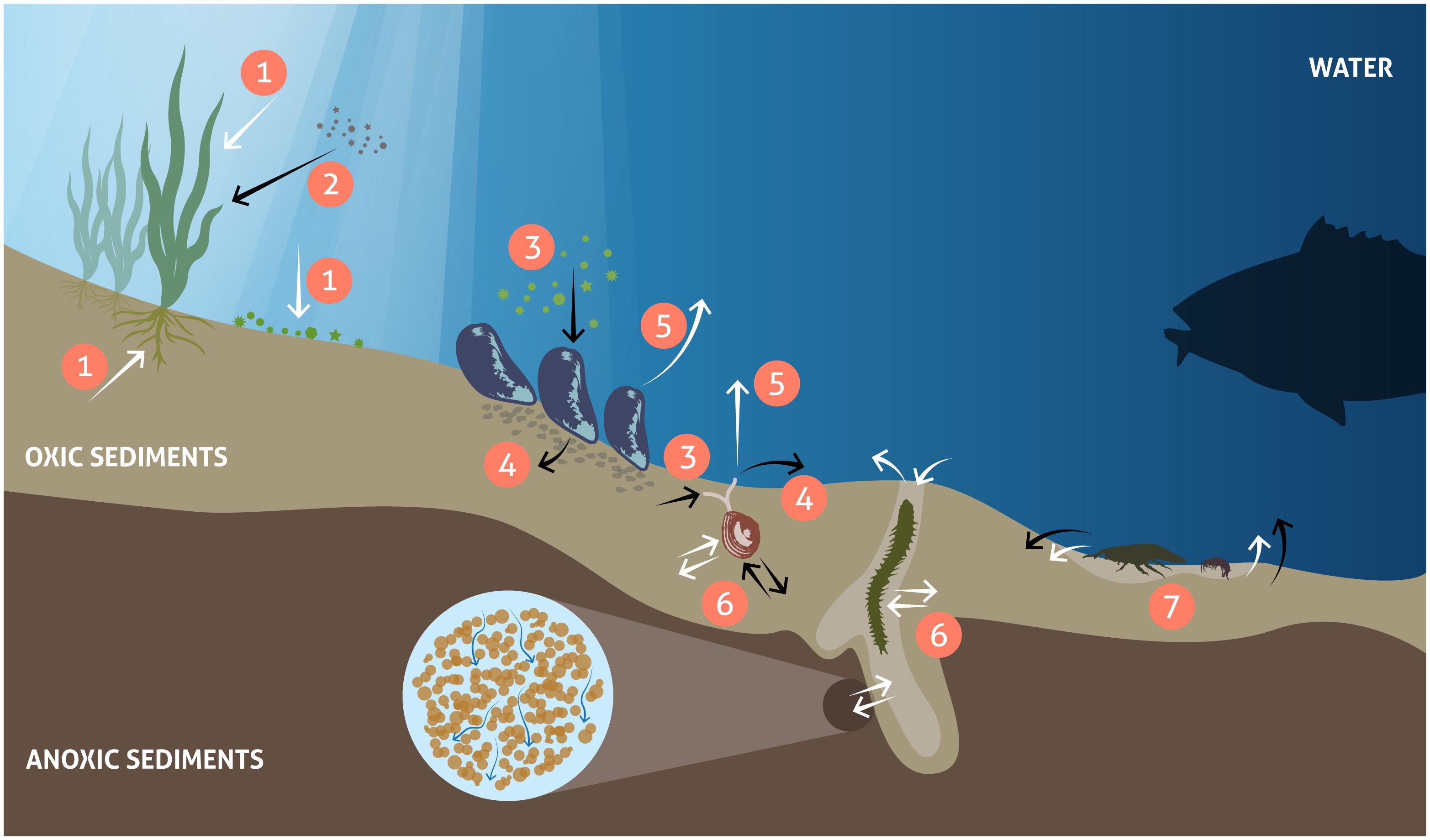
Vegetation and fauna processes controlling benthic biogeochemical fluxes. White arrows: solute fluxes, black arrows: particulate fluxes. Primary production: nutrient and CO_{2} uptake and oxygen release (1), enhanced sedimentation and sediment stabilization by benthic primary producers (2), food uptake (3), egestion/biodeposition of feces (4), nutrient excretion and respiration (5), and bioturbation, including bioirrigation (6) and mixing of sediments (7).

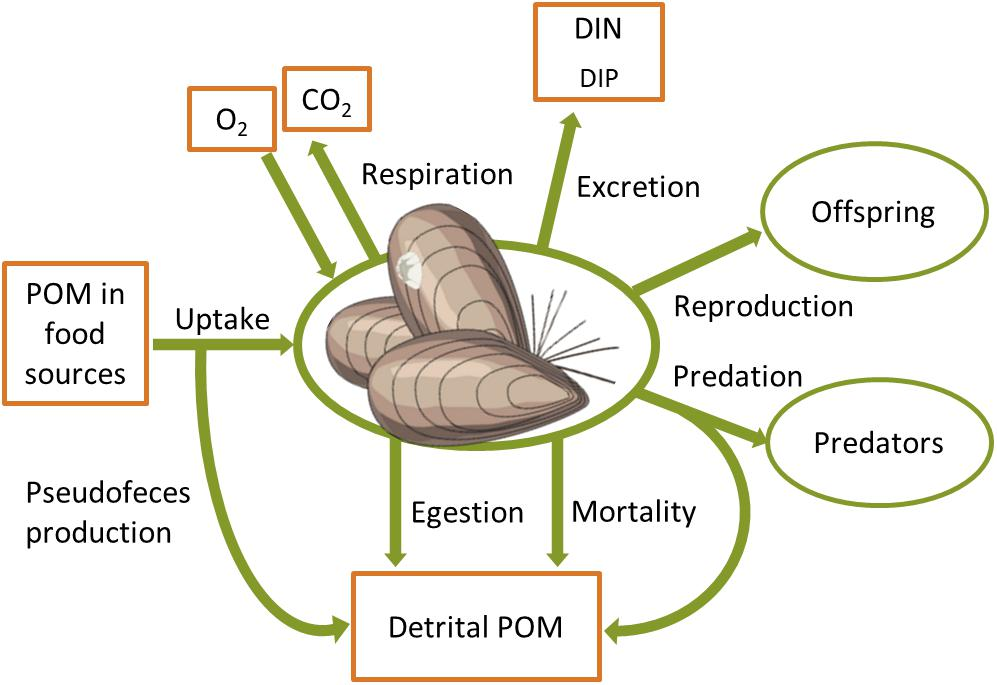
Biomass source and sink processes of benthic animals with links to carbon, nitrogen, phosphorus and oxygen cycles. POM = particulate organic matter. DIN, DIP = dissolved inorganic nitrogen and phosphorus respectively.

Globally, eutrophication is one of the major environmental problems in coastal ecosystems. Over the last century the annual riverine inputs of nitrogen and phosphorus to the oceans have increased from 19 to 37 megatonnes of nitrogen and from 2 to 4 megatonnes of phosphorus. Regionally, these increases were even more substantial as observed in the United States, Europe and China. In the Baltic Sea nitrogen and phosphorus loads increased by roughly a factor of three and six, respectively. The riverine nitrogen flux has increased by an order of magnitude to coastal waters of China within thirty years, while phosphorus export has tripled between 1970 and 2000.

Efforts to mitigate eutrophication through nutrient load reductions are hampered by the effects of climate change. Changes in precipitation increase the runoff of N, P and carbon (C) from land, which together with warming and increased CO_{2} dissolution alter the coupled marine nutrient and carbon cycles.

In contrast to the open ocean where biogeochemical cycling is largely dominated by pelagic processes driven primarily by ocean circulation, in the coastal zone, pelagic and benthic processes interact strongly and are driven by a complex and dynamic physical environment. Eutrophication in coastal areas leads to shifts toward rapidly growing opportunistic algae, and generally to a decline in benthic macrovegetation because of decreased light penetration, substrate change and more reducing sediments. Increased production and warming waters have caused expanding hypoxia at the seafloor with a consequent loss of benthic fauna. Hypoxic systems tend to lose many long-lived higher organisms and biogeochemical cycles typically become dominated by benthic bacterial processes and rapid pelagic turnover. However, if hypoxia does not occur, benthic fauna tends to increase in biomass with eutrophication.

Changes in benthic biota have far-reaching impacts on biogeochemical cycles in the coastal zone and beyond. In the illuminated zone, benthic microphytes and macrophytes mediate biogeochemical fluxes through primary production, nutrient storage and sediment stabilization and act as a habitat and food source for a variety of animals, as shown in the diagram on the left above. Benthic animals contribute to biogeochemical transformations and fluxes between water and sediments both directly through their metabolism and indirectly by physically reworking the sediments and their porewaters and stimulating bacterial processes. Grazing on pelagic organic matter and biodeposition of feces and pseudofeces by suspension-feeding fauna increases organic matter sedimentation rates. In addition, nutrients and carbon are retained in biomass and transformed from organic to inorganic forms through metabolic processes. Bioturbation, including sediment reworking and burrow ventilation activities (bioirrigation), redistributes particles and solutes within the sediment and enhances sediment-water fluxes of solutes. Bioturbation can also enhance resuspension of particles, a phenomenon termed "bioresuspension". Together, all these processes affect physical and chemical conditions at the sediment-water interface, and strongly influence organic matter degradation. When up-scaled to the ecosystem level, such modified conditions can significantly alter the functioning of coastal ecosystems and ultimately, the role of the coastal zone in filtering and transforming nutrients and carbon.

== Artisan fisheries ==
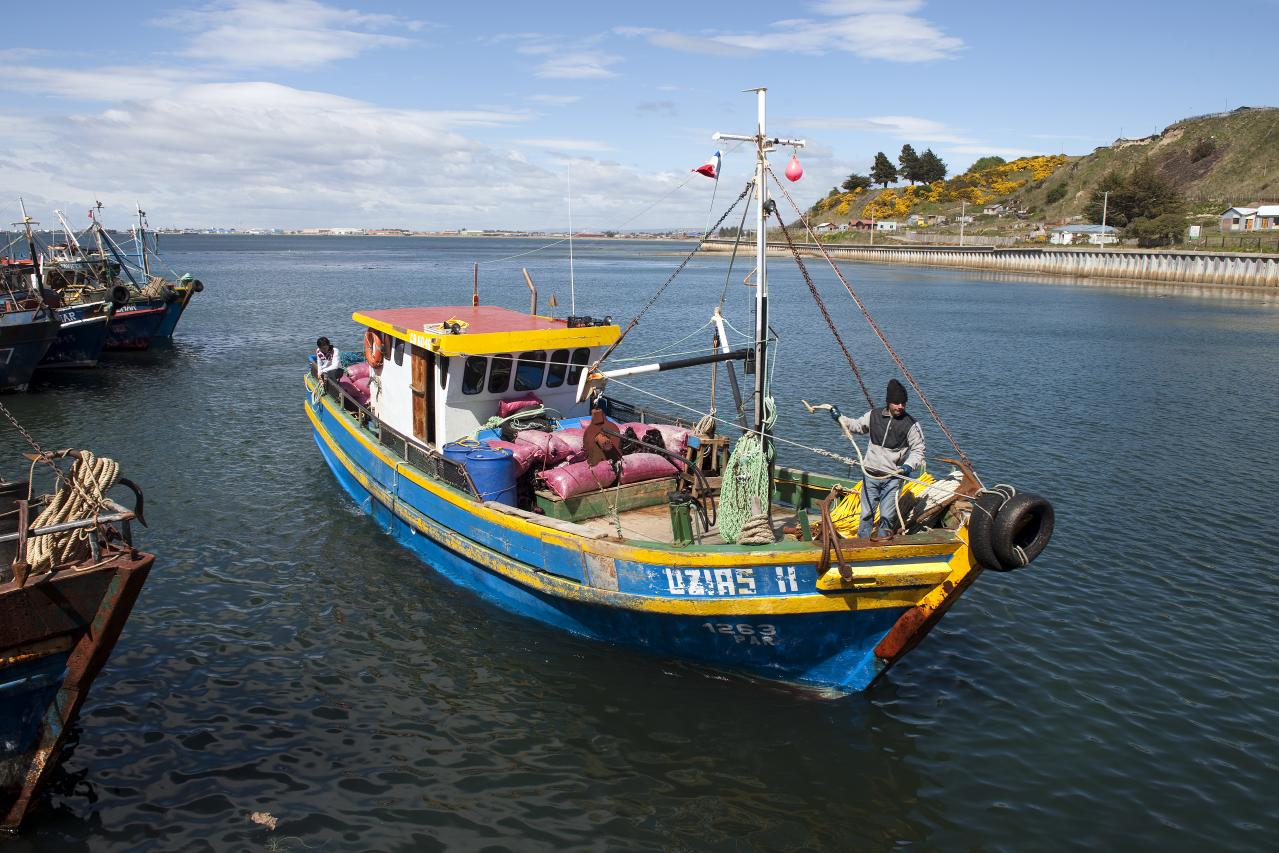
Chilean fishing boat

Artisanal fisheries use simple fishing gears and small vessels. Their activities tend to be confined to coastal areas. In general, top-down and bottom-up forces determine ecosystem functioning and dynamics. Fisheries as a top-down force can shorten and destabilise food webs, while effects driven by climate change can alter the bottom-up forces of primary productivity.

Direct human impacts and the full suite of drivers of global change are the main cause of species extinctions in Anthropocene ecosystems, with detrimental consequences on ecosystem functioning and their services to human societies. The world fisheries crisis is among those consequences, which cuts across fishing strategies, oceanic regions, species, and includes countries that have little regulation and those that have implemented rights-based co-management strategies to reduce overharvesting.

Chile has been one of the countries implementing Territorial Use Rights (TURFs) over an unprecedented geographic scale to manage the diverse coastal benthic resources using a co-management strategy. These TURFS are used for artisanal fisheries. Over 60 coastal benthic species are actively harvested by these artisanal fisheries, with species that are extracted from intertidal and shallow subtidal habitats. The Chilean TURFs system brought significant improvements in sustainability of this complex socio-ecological system, helping to rebuild benthic fish stocks, improving fishers' perception towards sustainability and increasing compliance9, as well as showing positive ancillary effects on conservation of biodiversity. However, the situation of most artisanal fisheries is still far from sustainable, and many fish stocks and coastal ecosystems show signs of overexploitation and ecosystem degradation, a consequence of the low levels of cooperation and low enforcement of TURF regulations, which leads to high levels of free-riding and illegal fishing. It is imperative to improve understanding of the effects of these multi-species artisanal fisheries which simultaneously harvest species at all trophic levels from kelp primary producers to top carnivores.

== Remote sensing ==
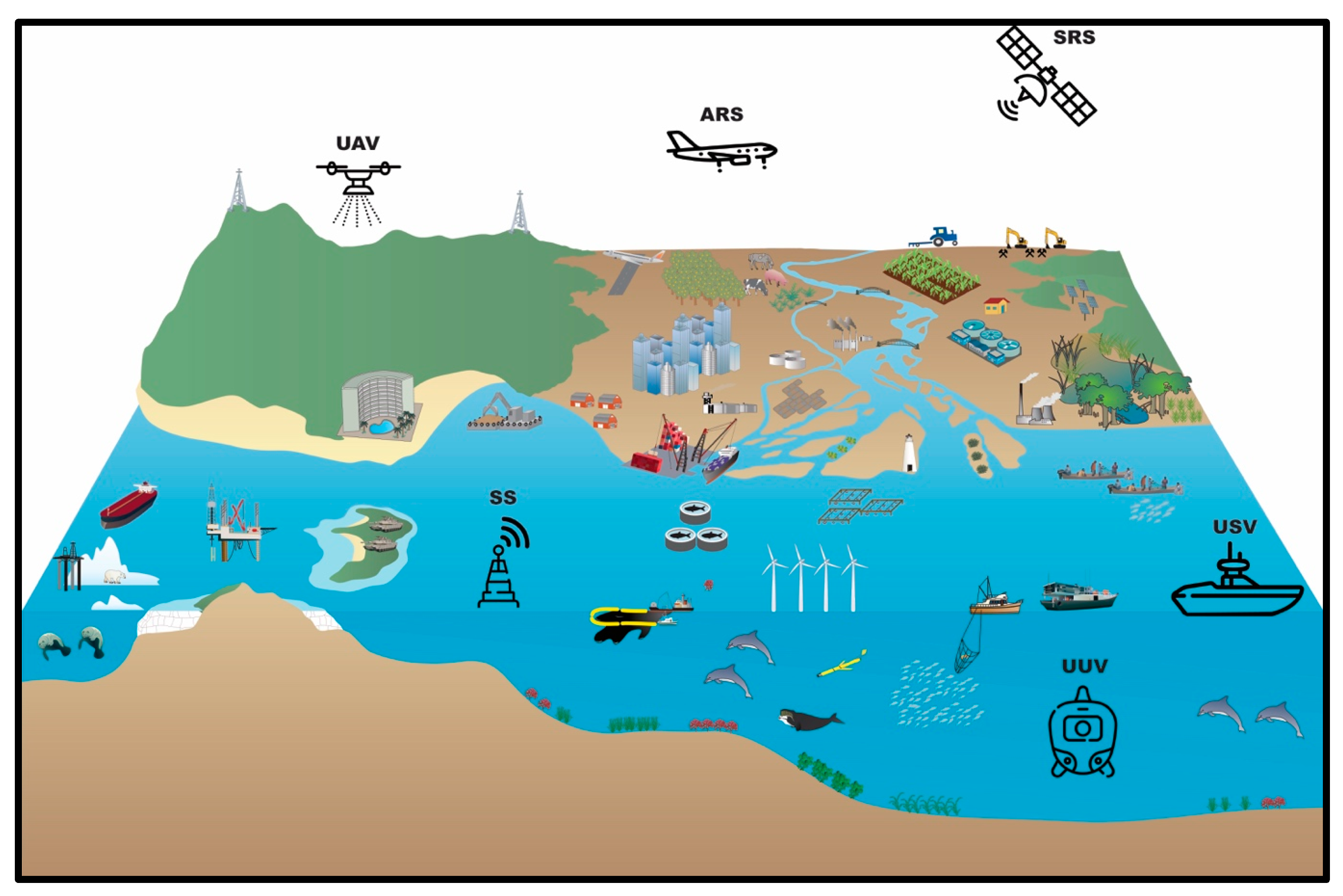
Remote sensing of marine coastal environments

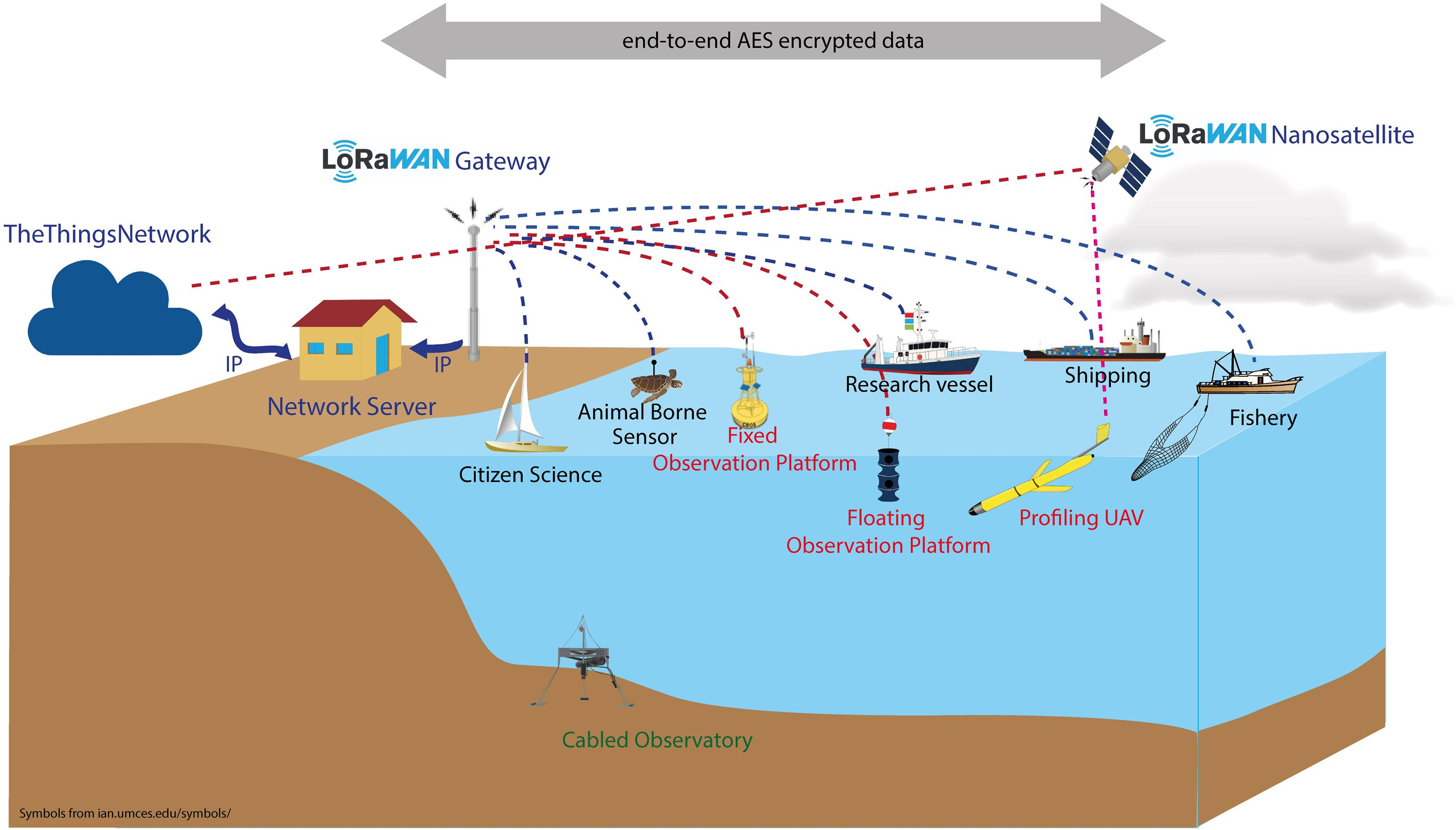
"Internet of Things" communication network along the marine coast. Red names identify dedicated platforms, blue cooperative platforms, and green cabled platforms. Dashed lines represent communication channels connecting platforms to a gateway using a specific wireless communication protocol depending on local availability and cost. The gateway is connected to a network server by any IP communication technology available. The network server connects to a number of specific application servers which make the data accessible through a web browser. The transmission channel employs an end-to-end AES encryption protocol.

Coastal zones are among the most populated areas on the planet. As the population continues to increase, economic development must expand to support human welfare. However, this development may damage the ability of the coastal environment to continue supporting human welfare for current and future generations. The management of complex coastal and marine social-ecological systems requires tools that provide frameworks with the capability of responding to current and emergent issues. Remote data collection technologies include satellite-based remote sensing, aerial remote sensing, unmanned aerial vehicles, unmanned surface vehicles, unmanned underwater vehicles, and static sensors.

Frameworks have been developed that attempt to address and integrate these complex issues, such as the Millennium Ecosystem Assessment framework which links drivers, ecosystem services, and human welfare However, obtaining the environmental data that is necessary to use such frameworks is difficult, especially in countries where access to reliable data and their dissemination are limited or non-existent and even thwarted. Traditional techniques of point sampling and observation in the environment do deliver high information content, but they are expensive and often do not provide adequate spatial and temporal coverage, while remote sensing can provide cost-effective solutions, as well as data for locations where there is no or only limited information.

Coastal observing systems are typically nationally funded and built around national priorities. As a result, there are presently significant differences between countries in terms of sustainability, observing capacity and technologies, as well as methods and research priorities. Ocean observing systems in coastal areas need to move toward integrated, multidisciplinary and multiscale systems, where heterogeneity can be exploited to deliver fit-for-purpose answers. Essential elements of such distributed observation systems are the use of machine-to-machine communication, data fusion and processing applying recent technological developments for the Internet of Things (IoT) toward a common cyberinfrastructure. It has been argued that the standardisation that IoT brings to wireless sensing will revolutionise areas like this.

Coastal areas are the most dynamic and productive parts of the oceans, which makes them a significant source of human resources and services. Coastal waters are located immediately in contact with human populations and exposed to anthropogenic disturbances, placing these resources and services under threat. These concerns explain why, in several coastal regions, a rapidly increasing number of observing systems have been implemented in the last decade. Expansion of coherent and sustained coastal observations has been fragmented and driven by national and regional policies and is often undertaken through short-term research projects. This results in significant differences between countries both in terms of sustainability and observing technologies, methods and research priorities.

Unlike the open ocean, where challenges are rather well-defined and stakeholders are fewer and well-identified, coastal processes are complex, acting on several spatial and temporal scales, with numerous and diversified users and stakeholders, often with conflicting interests. To adapt to such complexity coastal ocean observing system must be an integrated, multidisciplinary and multiscale system of systems.

== Regime shifts ==
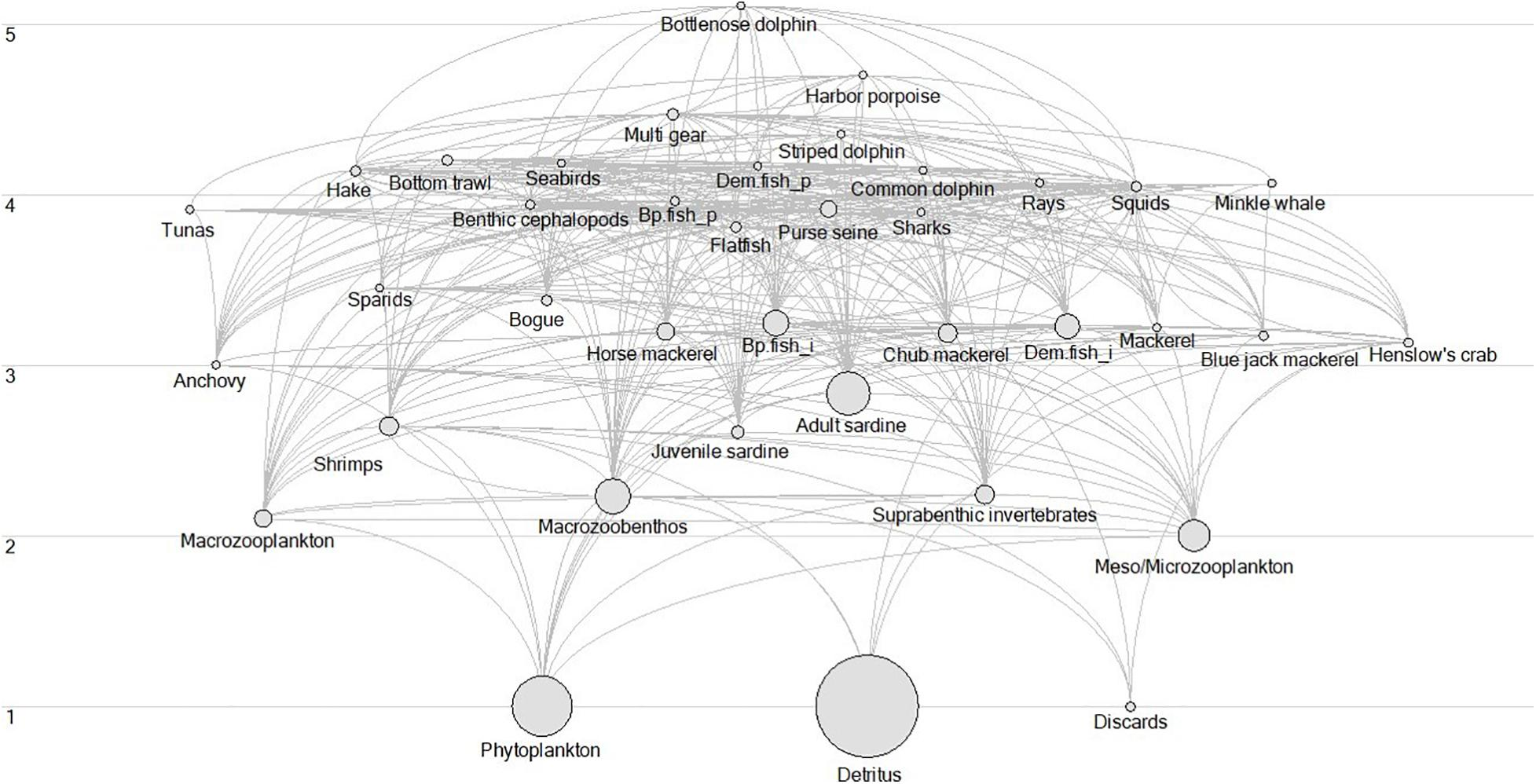
Flow diagram of the Portuguese continental shelf ecosystem

Marine ecosystems are affected by diverse pressures and consequently may undergo significant changes that can be interpreted as regime shifts. Marine ecosystems worldwide are affected by increasing natural and anthropogenic pressures and consequently undergo significant changes at unprecedented rates. Affected by these changes, ecosystems can reorganise and still maintain the same function, structure, and identity. However, under some circumstances, the ecosystem may undergo changes that modify the system's structure and function and this process can be described as a shift to a new regime.

Usually, a regime shift is triggered by large-scale climate-induced variations, intense fishing exploitation or both. Criteria used to define regime shifts vary and the changes that have to occur in order to consider that a system has undergone a regime shift are not well-defined. Normally, regime shifts are defined as high amplitude, low-frequency and often abrupt changes in species abundance and community composition that are observed at multiple trophic levels (TLs). These changes are expected to occur on a large spatial scale and take place concurrently with physical changes in the climate system.

Regime shifts have been described in several marine ecosystems including Northern Benguela, the North Sea, and the Baltic Sea. In large upwelling ecosystems, it is common to observe decadal fluctuations in species abundance and their replacements. These fluctuations might be irreversible and might be an indicator of the new regime, as was the case in the Northern Benguela ecosystem. However, changes in the upwelling systems might be interpreted as fluctuations within the limits of natural variability for an ecosystem, and not as an indicator of the regime shift. The Portuguese continental shelf ecosystem (PCSE) constitutes the northernmost part of the Canary Current Upwelling System and is characterised by seasonal upwelling that occurs during the spring and summer as a result of steady northerly winds. It has recently changed in the abundance of coastal pelagic species such as sardine, chub mackerel, horse mackerel, blue jack mackerel and anchovy. Moreover, in the last decades, an increase in higher trophic level species has been documented. The causes underlying changes in the pelagic community are not clear but it has been suggested that they result from a complex interplay between environmental variability, species interactions and fishing pressure.

There is evidence, that changes in the intensity of the Iberian coastal upwelling (resulting from the strengthening or weakening northern winds) had occurred in the last decades. However, the character of these changes is contradictory where some authors observed intensification of upwelling-favourable winds while others documented their weakening. A 2019 review of upwelling rate and intensity along the Portuguese coast documented a successive weakening of the upwelling since 1950 that lasted till mid/late 1970s in the north-west and south-west and till 1994 in the south coast. An increase in upwelling index over the period 1985–2009 was documented in all studied regions while additionally upwelling intensification were observed in the south. A continuous increase in water temperature, ranging from 0.1 to 0.2 °C per decade has also been documented.

== Threats and decline ==
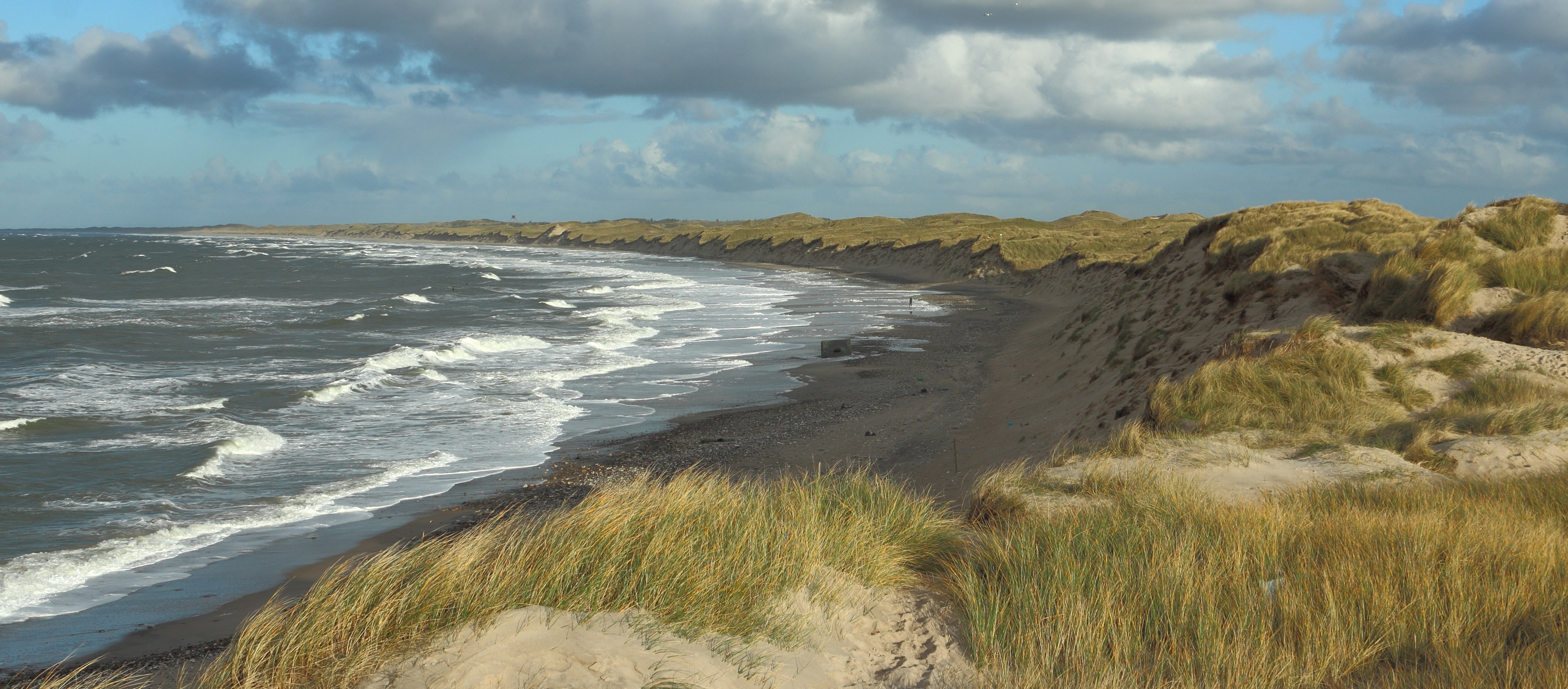
Sandy coast

Many marine fauna utilise coastal habitats as critical nursery areas, for shelter and feeding, yet these habitats are increasingly at risk from agriculture, aquaculture, industry and urban expansion. Indeed, these systems are subject to what may be called "a triple whammy" of increasing industrialisation and urbanisation, an increased loss of biological and physical resources (fish, water, energy, space), and a decreased resilience to the consequences of a warming climate and sea level rise. This has given rise to the complete loss, modification or disconnection of natural coastal ecosystems globally. For example, almost 10% of the entire Great Barrier Reef coastline in Australia (2,300 km) has been replaced with urban infrastructure (e.g., rock seawalls, jetties, marinas), causing massive loss and fragmentation of sensitive coastal ecosystems. Global loss of seagrass reached around 7% of seagrasses area per year by the end of the twentieth century. A global analysis of tidal wetlands (mangroves, tidal flats, and tidal marshes) published in 2022 estimated global losses of 13,700 km^{2} (5,300 mi^{2}) from 1999-2019, however, this study also estimated that these losses were largely offset by the establishment of 9,700 km^{2} (3,700 mi^{2}) of new tidal wetlands that were not present in 1999. Approximately three-quarters of the 4,000 km^{2} (1,500 mi^{2}) net decrease between 1999 and 2019 occurred in Asia (74.1%), with 68.6% concentrated in three countries: Indonesia (36%), China (20.6%), and Myanmar (12%). Of these global tidal wetland losses and gains, 39% of losses and 14% of gains were attributed to direct human activities.

Approximately 40% of the global mangrove has been lost since the 1950s with more than 9,736 km^{2} of the world's mangroves continuing to be degraded in the 20 years period between 1996 and 2016. Saltmarshes are drained when coastal land is claimed for agriculture, and deforestation is an increasing threat to shoreline vegetation (such as mangroves) when coastal land is appropriated for urban and industrial development, both of which may result in the degradation of blue carbon storages and increasing greenhouse gas emissions.

These accumulating pressures and impacts on coastal ecosystems are neither isolated nor independent, rather they are synergistic, with feedbacks and interactions that cause individual effects to be greater than their sums. In the year before the ecosystem restoration Decade commences, there is a critical knowledge deficit inhibiting an appreciation of the complexity of coastal ecosystems that hampers the development of responses to mitigate continuing impacts—not to mention uncertainty on projected losses of coastal systems for some of the worst-case future climate change scenarios.

== Restoration ==
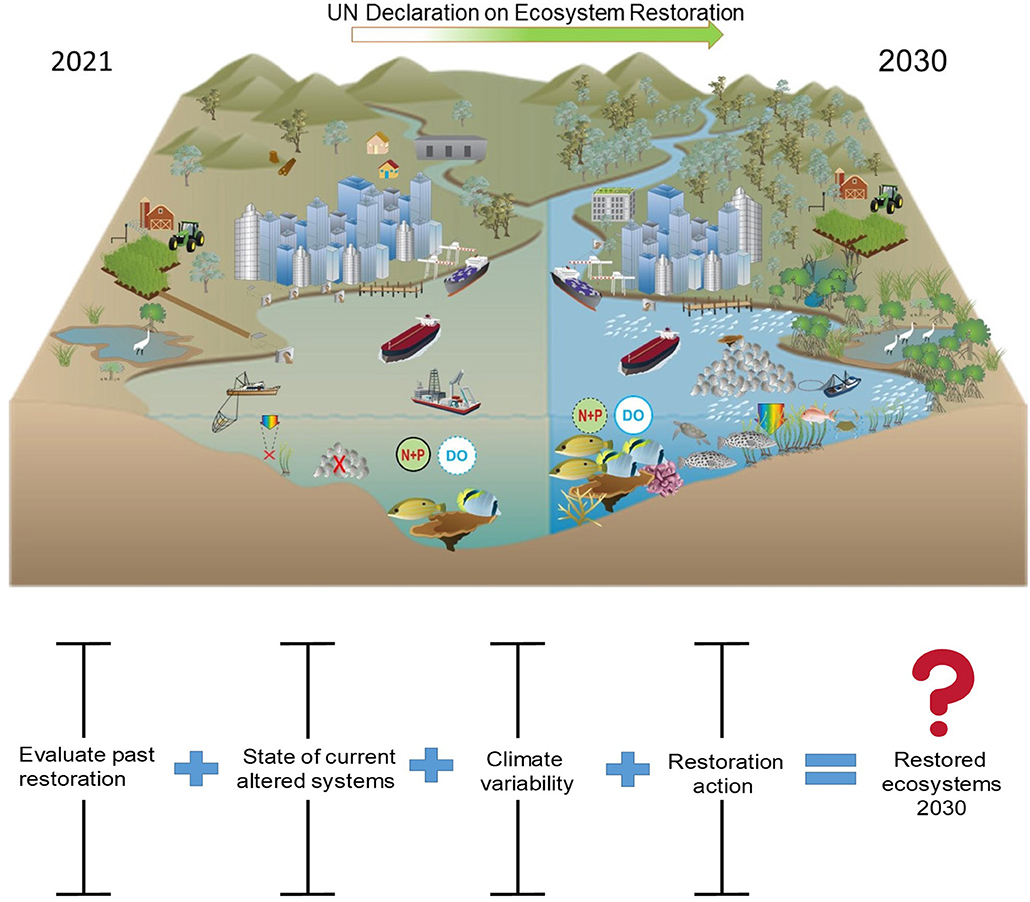
UN Decade on Ecosystem Restoration: 2021 to 2030 – coastal ecosystems

The United Nations has declared 2021–2030 the UN Decade on Ecosystem Restoration. This call to action has the purpose of recognising the need to massively accelerate global restoration of degraded ecosystems, to fight the climate heating crisis, enhance food security, provide clean water and protect biodiversity on the planet. The scale of restoration will be key. For example, the Bonn Challenge has the goal to restore 350 million km^{2}, about the size of India, of degraded terrestrial ecosystems by 2030. However, international support for restoration of blue coastal ecosystems, which provide an impressive array of benefits to people, has lagged.

The diagram on the right shows the current state of modified and impacted coastal ecosystems and the expected state following the decade of restoration. Also, shown is the uncertainty in the success of past restoration efforts, current state of altered systems, climate variability, and restoration actions that are available now or on the horizon. This could mean that delivering the Decade on Ecosystem Restoration for coastal systems needs to be viewed as a means of getting things going where the benefits might take longer than a decade.

Only the Global Mangrove Alliance comes close to the Bonn Challenge, with the aim of increasing the global area of mangroves by 20% by 2030. However, mangrove scientists have reservations about this target, voicing concerns that it is unrealistic and may prompt inappropriate practices in attempting to reach this target.

== Conservation and connectivity ==
There has recently been a perceptual shift away from habitat representation as the sole or primary focus of conservation prioritisation, towards consideration of ecological processes that shape the distribution and abundance of biodiversity features. In marine ecosystems, connectivity processes are paramount, and designing systems of marine protected areas that maintain connectivity between habitat patches has long been considered an objective of conservation planning. Two forms of connectivity are critical to structuring coral reef fish populations: dispersal of larvae in the pelagic environment, and post-settlement migration by individuals across the seascape. Whilst a growing literature has described approaches for considering larval connectivity in conservation prioritisation, relatively less attention has been directed towards developing and applying methods for considering post-settlement connectivity

Seascape connectivity (connectedness among different habitats in a seascape, cf. among patches of the same habitat type) is essential for species that utilise more than one habitat, either during diurnal movements or at different stages in their life history. Mangroves, seagrass beds, and lagoon reefs provide nursery areas for many commercially and ecologically important fish species that subsequently make ontogenetic shifts to adult populations on coral reefs. These back-reef habitats are often overlooked for conservation or management in favour of coral reefs that support greater adult biomass, yet they can be equally if not more at risk from habitat degradation and loss. Even where juveniles are not targeted by fishers, they can be vulnerable to habitat degradation, for example from sedimentation caused by poor land-use practices.

There is clear empirical evidence that proximity to nursery habitats can enhance the effectiveness (i.e. increasing the abundance, density, or biomass of fish species) of marine protected areas on coral reefs. For example, at study sites across the western Pacific, the abundance of harvested fish species was significantly greater on protected reefs close to mangroves, but not on protected reefs isolated from mangroves. The functional role of herbivorous fish species that perform ontogenetic migrations may also enhance the resilience of coral reefs close to mangroves. Despite this evidence, and widespread calls to account for connectivity among habitats in the design of spatial management, there remain few examples where seascape connectivity is explicitly considered in spatial conservation prioritisation (the analytical process of identifying priority areas for conservation or management actions).

== See also ==
- Blue carbon
- Coast
- Coastal biogeomorphology
- Shallow water marine environment
- Tides in marginal seas
