= Tree planting =

Process of transplanting tree seedlings

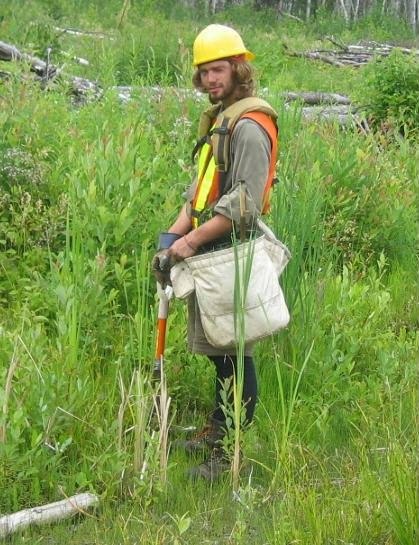
A tree planter in northern Ontario

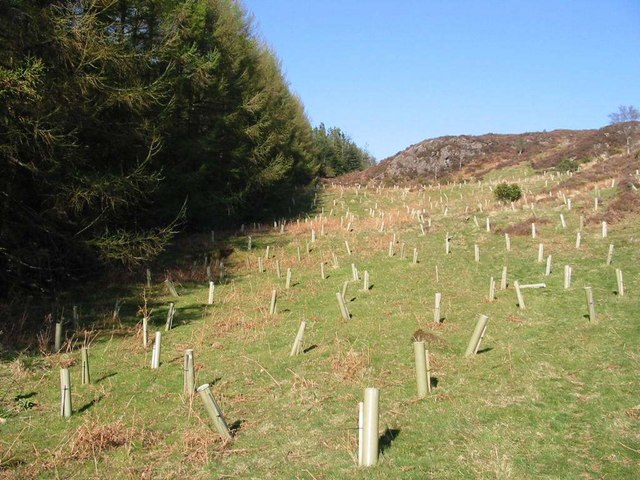
Tree planting is an aspect of habitat conservation. In each plastic tube, a hardwood tree has been planted.

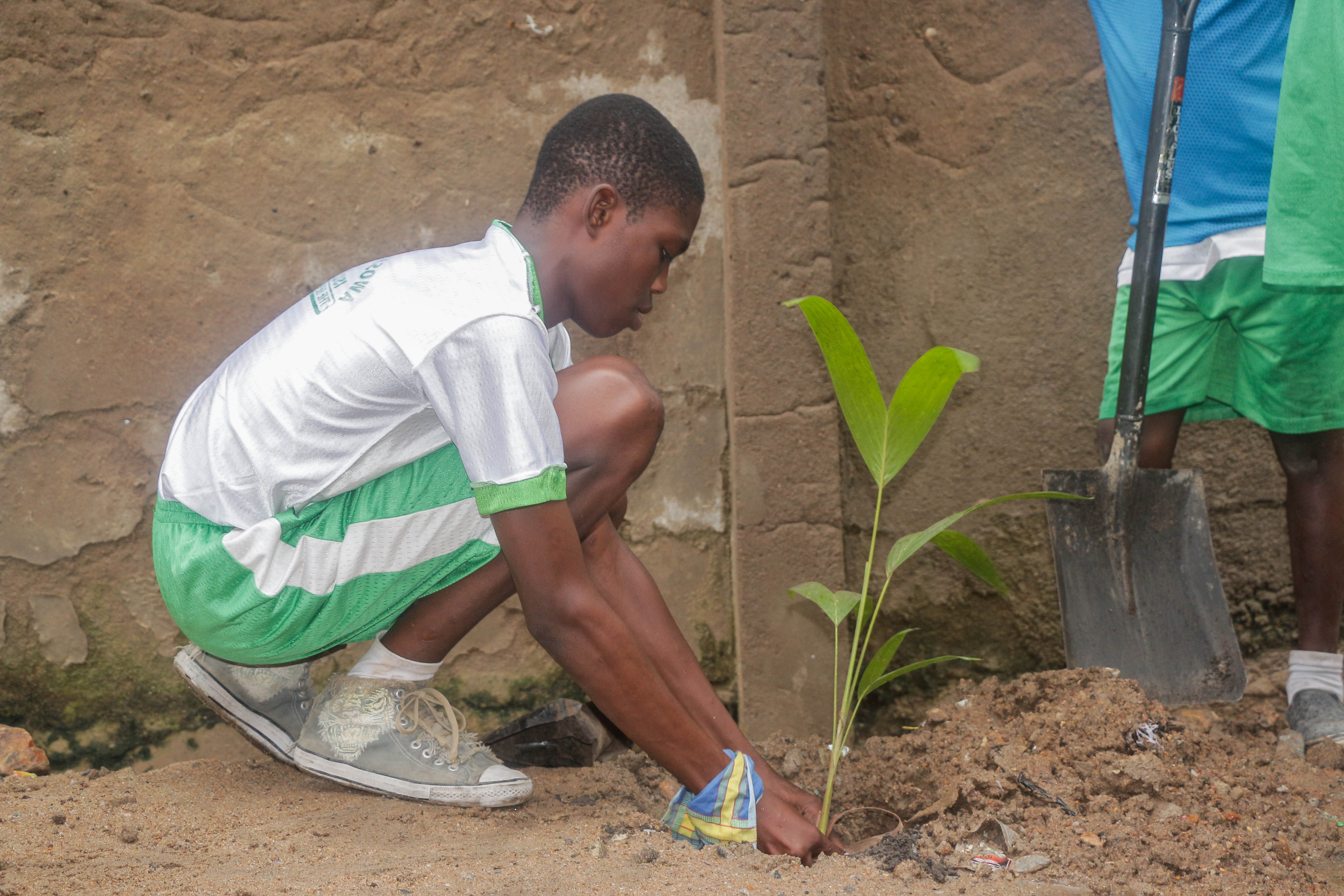
Tree planting in Ghana

Tree planting is the process of transplanting tree seedlings, generally for forestry, land reclamation, or landscaping purposes. It differs from the transplantation of larger trees in arboriculture and from the lower-cost but slower and less reliable distribution of tree seeds. Trees contribute to their environment over long periods of time by improving air quality, climate amelioration, conserving water, preserving soil, and supporting wildlife. During the process of photosynthesis, trees take in carbon dioxide and produce oxygen.

In silviculture, the activity is known as "reforestation", or "afforestation," depending on whether the area being planted has recently been forested or not. It involves planting seedlings over an area of land where the forest has been harvested or damaged by fire, disease, or human activity. Trees are planted in many different parts of the world, and strategies may differ widely across nations and regions and among individual reforestation companies. Tree planting is grounded in forest science and, if performed properly, can result in the successful regeneration of a deforested area. However a planted forest rarely replicates the biodiversity and complexity of a natural forest.

Because trees remove carbon dioxide from the air as they grow, tree planting can be used to help limit climate change. Desert greening projects are also motivated by improved biodiversity and reclamation of natural water systems, as well as improved economic and social welfare due to an increased number of jobs in farming and forestry.

== Types of trees planted ==
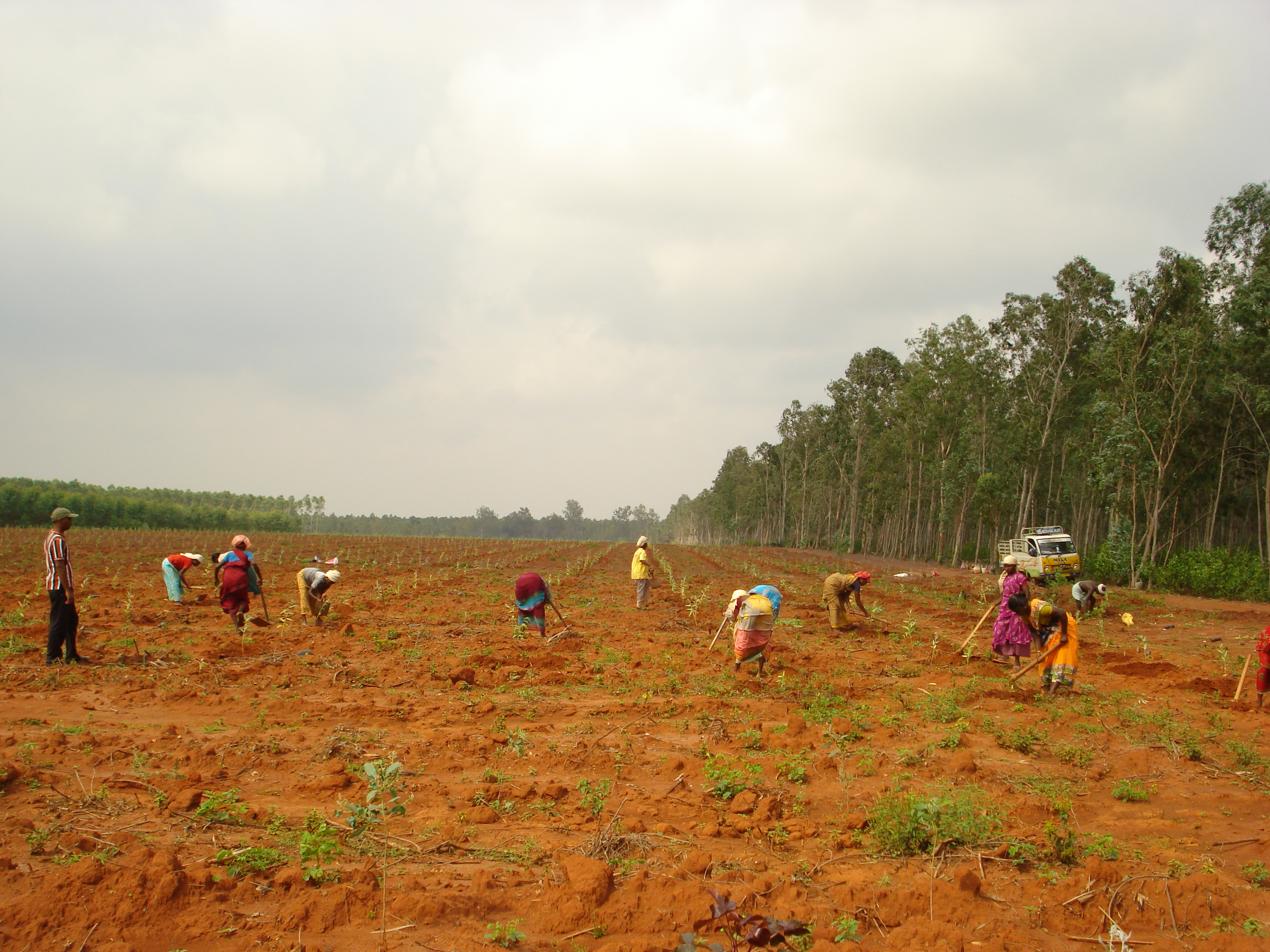
A eucalyptus plantation in final stages at Arimalam in Tamil Nadu, India

The type of tree planted may have great influence on the environmental outcomes. It is often much more profitable to outside interests to plant fast-growing species, such as eucalyptus, casuarina or pine (e.g., Pinus radiata or Pinus caribaea), even though the environmental and biodiversity benefits of such monoculture plantations are not comparable to native forest, and such offset projects are frequently objects of controversy.

To promote the growth of native ecosystems, many environmentalists advocate only indigenous trees be planted. A practical solution is to plant tough, fast-growing native tree species which begin rebuilding the land. Planting non-invasive trees that assist in the natural return of indigenous species is called "assisted natural regeneration." There are many such species that can be planted, of which about 12 are in widespread use in the US.

Alternatively, farmer-managed natural regeneration (FMNR), involves farmers preserving trees (not replanting), and is considered to be a more cost-effective method of reforestation than regular tree planting.

== Season of planting ==
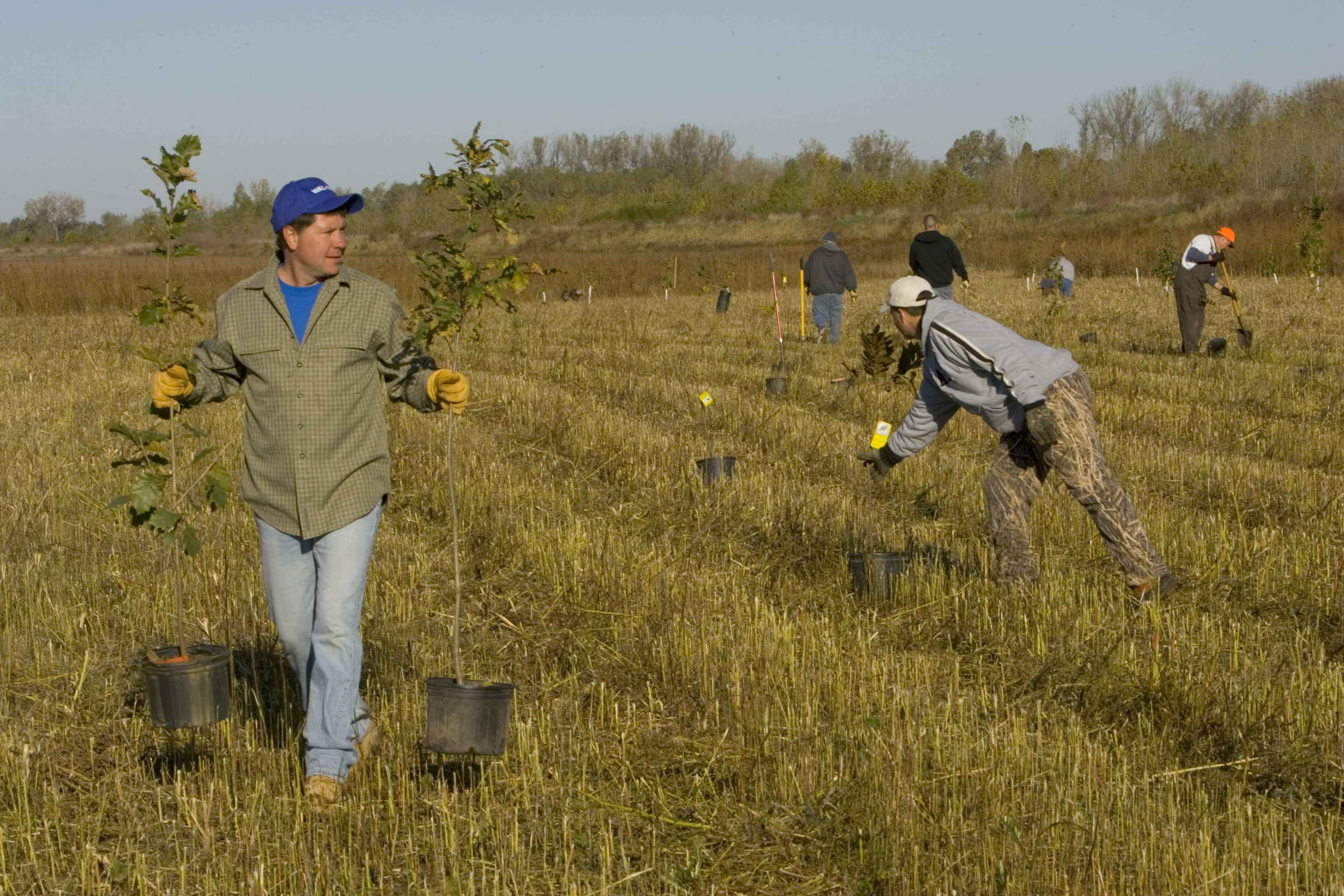
Planting trees in USA

=== Bareroot stock ===
The classical silvicultural literature unanimously advocates spring as the time to plant bareroot stock, with lifting and outplanting taking place while the trees are still apparently dormant. This view, in which spring planting is implicit, was epitomized by Toumey and Korstian (1942): "Almost without exception the most favourable time for ... planting is 2 weeks or more before buds [of the planting stock] begin their growth". Soil moisture conditions are generally favourable at the time when the growing season is about to begin, while dormant stock is less subject to mechanical injury and physiological shock.

If the size of the planting program allows, there is little doubt that such scheduling would be advantageous in that it satisfies one, and commonly 2, of the factors essential for success: (1) the use of planting stock that is physiologically capable of responding to a growth environment at planting, and (2) planting when site factors favour tree survival and growth. The 3rd factor a good planting job, and although desirable in all plantings, is probably somewhat less critical in conventional spring plantings than at other times. If, however, a planting program cannot be completed in this way, there are other options: conventional fall planting with fresh-lifted stock; summer planting with fresh-lifted stock; and spring and summer planting with stored spring-lifted or fall-lifted stock.

=== Conventional spring planting with fresh spring-lifted stock ===
In the context of regeneration silviculture, "spring", "summer", etc. lack precise meaning. Typically, the spring planting season begins as soon as lifting becomes possible in the nursery, and ends with the completion of the program. At this time, planting stock is physiologically attuned to the oncoming growing season, and the outplant has the whole of that season in which to establish its root system before it is challenged by any frost heaving. In practice, ideals are seldom attained. That stock is normally dormant when spring-planted is a widespread fallacy. Active growth is commonly obvious at the time of planting, but in any case the metabolic activity increases in planting stock before the tops give visible expression to this. The difficulty of obtaining, in quantity, spring-lifted stock in dormant condition increases with increasing continentality of climate. In many areas, the period of springlike weather is unreliable and often short. As well, the soil moisture advantage claimed for spring planting is also insecurely founded. Soils that are sandy or gravelly, and shallow soils of any texture are highly dependent on current weather due to their limited available water capacities. Nor will a plentiful supply of soil moisture benefit an outplant whose roots are enveloped in anaerobic and/or cold soil, and mortality of trees outplanted into soil colder than about 6 °C may be excessive.

The spruces may be planted not only throughout the spring planting period provided that the period of most active shoot elongation is avoided, but virtually throughout the whole growing season, with little loss of performance other than some reduction in increment.

=== Conventional fall planting with fresh-lifted stock ===
The fall planting season is generally considered to begin when nursery stock has hardened off and soil moisture reserves have been replenished by autumnal rain. It then continues until the planting program has been completed or is terminated by freeze-up or heavy snow. The advantages of fall planting were once considered "To outweigh those of spring so certainly" that in the National Forests of the Lake States almost all planting was done in the fall, but in spite of some success, operational fall plantings in North America have tended to be less successful than operational spring plantings. On certain sites, a major disadvantage of fall planting is that the root systems of outplants have little time in which to become firmly anchored before being subjected to frost heaving. Such plants are also vulnerable to "winter browning", which may occur in the fall soon after planting, especially among stock having high shoot:root ratios. Relationships between dormancy progression and physiological condition, including root-growth capacity, are much less clear in the spruces than in the pines, but certainly there is good evidence that, in the absence of frost heaving, plantings of spruces can be just as successful in fall as in spring.

=== Summer planting with fresh-lifted stock ===
Conceptually and logistically, the simplest way of extending the conventional planting season is to extend lifting and planting of fresh stock through summer until the planting program has been competed. Summer planting has also been successful in a number of research studies with white spruce, e.g., Crossley 1956; Ackerman and Johnson 1962; Decie 1962 cited by Revel and Coates 1976; Burgar and Lyon 1968; Mullin 1971, 1974; Revel and Coates 1976. Success depends on minimizing stresses to planting stock at all stages from lifting through planting and on planting when site conditions are conducive to survival and growth.

=== Spring and summer planting with stored stock ===
Refrigerated storage of planting stock has been developed largely with the aim of overcoming problems experienced in using flushed planting stock. Storage provides a means of holding stock for use when fresh stock is either unavailable or at a stage of development that renders it unsuitable for planting. It also offers possibilities of manipulating the physiological condition of the stock. However, there are problems associated with storage, e.g., mold, cold injury, desiccation, and depletion of food reserves. The rate of deterioration depends very much on the physiological condition of the planting stock at the time of lifting, as well as on the storage environment and duration of storage.

Mullin and Forcier (1976) and Mullin and Reffle (1980) examined the effects of spring-lifting date and planting date on several species, including 3+0 white spruce after frozen storage, with fresh-lifted controls planted on each planting date for comparison. In all plantings, the earliest (2 May) lifting gave highest average second-year survival in all species. In another study, Mullin (1978) found that outplantings of frozen-stored 3+0 white spruce were consistently successful to the end of July only with the earliest-lifted (25 April) stock. Sutton (1982) also used 3+0 white spruce in outplanting every 2 weeks from the end of June through the growing season in 3 successive years on a variety of sites in northern Ontario. Despite variation in planting stock, poor storage environments and adverse weather, 4th-year results showed a consistent pattern of reasonable survival and growth rates among trees planted through July, with a rapid decline in performance of trees planted thereafter. Overwinter storage of stock has also been employed. It has the advantage of lifting stock at the end of the growing season when physiological processes are invoking natural dormancy.

Natural refrigerated overwinter storage has been used in root cellars and snow caches. Using natural refrigeration in root cellar storage, Jorgensen and Stanek (1962) kept 3+0 and 2+2 white spruce in dormant condition for 6 months without apparent detriment to performance after outplanting. Moreover, the stock was highly resistant to spring frost damage. Natural cold storage for overwintering 3+0 and 2+2 white spruce was also used by Mullin (1966). Unlike Jorgensen and Stanek's (1962) stock, which was raised 550 km to the south of where it was planted, Mullin's stock was raised in a nursery at about the same latitude as the planting site; the stock experienced inside-bale temperatures down to -15 °C in mid-winter, but still showed first- and second-year survival rates of 85.9% and 65.9%, respectively, compared with 91.4% and 76.2%, respectively, for fresh-lifted stock. However, Mullin's stored stock was much more damaged by spring frost than fresh-lifted stock and it "showed a reduction in vigour as measured in terms of survival, susceptibility to damage and growth".

== Role in climate change mitigation ==
Proportion of carbon stock in forest carbon pools, 2020

Total forest carbon stock, by carbon pool, 2025.

Forests are an important part of the global carbon cycle because trees and plants absorb carbon dioxide through photosynthesis. Therefore, they play an important role in climate change mitigation. By removing the greenhouse gas CO_{2} from the air, forests function as terrestrial carbon sinks, meaning they store large amounts of carbon in the form of biomass, encompassing roots, stems, branches, and leaves. By doing so, forests sequester approximately 25% of human carbon emissions annually, playing a critical role in Earth's climate. Throughout their lifespan, trees continue to sequester carbon, storing atmospheric CO_{2} long-term. Sustainable forest management, afforestation, reforestation are therefore important contributions to climate change mitigation.

An important consideration in such efforts is that forests can turn from sinks to carbon sources. In 2019 forests took up a third less carbon than they did in the 1990s, due to higher temperatures, droughts and deforestation. National-scale forest inventory data also shows trends from 1999 to 2020 that some forests were already approaching climate thresholds shifting them from carbon sinks to carbon sources. The typical tropical forest may become a carbon source by the 2060s.

Researchers have found that, in terms of environmental services, it is better to avoid deforestation than to allow for deforestation to subsequently reforest, as the latter leads to irreversible effects in terms of biodiversity loss and soil degradation. Furthermore, the probability that legacy carbon will be released from soil is higher in a younger boreal forest. In particular, boreal forests have been noted to support the growth of Armillaria (honey fungus), which is a root pathogen that breaks down compounds necessary for wood integrity, increasing the likelihood of carbon release. Global greenhouse gas emissions caused by damage to tropical rainforests may have been substantially underestimated until around 2019. Additionally, the effects of afforestation and reforestation will be farther in the future than keeping existing forests intact. It takes much longer − several decades − for the benefits for global warming to manifest to the same carbon sequestration benefits from mature trees in tropical forests and hence from limiting deforestation. Therefore, scientists consider "the protection and recovery of carbon-rich and long-lived ecosystems, especially natural forests" to be "the major climate solution".

The planting of trees on marginal crop and pasture lands helps to incorporate carbon from atmospheric CO_{2} into biomass. For this carbon sequestration process to succeed the carbon must not return to the atmosphere from biomass burning or rotting when the trees die. Several species of Ficus such as Ficus wakefieldii have been observed to sequester atmospheric CO_{2} as calcium oxalate in the presence of oxalotrophic bacteria and fungi, which catabolize the oxalate, which produces calcium carbonate. The calcium carbonate is precipitated throughout the tree, which also alkalinizes the surrounding soil. These species are current candidates for carbon sequestration in agroforestry. Another example for an oxalogene tree is Brosimum alicastrum. This Calcium-oxalate fixation process was first observed in the Iroko tree, which can sequester up to a ton of calcium carbonate in the soil over its lifespan. Also Cacti, such as the Saguaro, transfer carbon from the biological cycle to the geological cycle by forming the mineral calcium carbonate.

Earth offers enough room to plant an additional 0.9 billion ha of tree canopy cover, although this estimate has been criticized, and the true area that has a net cooling effect on the climate when accounting for biophysical feedbacks like albedo is 20-80% lower. Planting and protecting these trees would sequester 205 billion tons of carbon if the trees survive future climate stress to reach maturity. To put this number into perspective, this is about 20 years of current global carbon emissions (as of 2019) . This level of sequestration would represent about 25% of the atmosphere's carbon pool in 2019.

Life expectancy of forests varies throughout the world, influenced by tree species, site conditions, and natural disturbance patterns. In some forests, carbon may be stored for centuries, while in other forests, carbon is released with frequent stand replacing fires. Forests that are harvested prior to stand replacing events allow for the retention of carbon in manufactured forest products such as lumber. However, only a portion of the carbon removed from logged forests ends up as durable goods and buildings. The remainder ends up as sawmill by-products such as pulp, paper, and pallets. If all new construction globally utilized 90% wood products, largely via adoption of mass timber in low rise construction, this could sequester 700 million net tons of carbon per year. This is in addition to the elimination of carbon emissions from the displaced construction material such as steel or concrete, which are carbon-intense to produce.

A meta-analysis found that mixed species plantations would increase carbon storage alongside other benefits of diversifying planted forests.

Although a bamboo forest stores less total carbon than a mature forest of trees, a bamboo plantation sequesters carbon at a much faster rate than a mature forest or a tree plantation. Therefore, the farming of bamboo timber may have significant carbon sequestration potential.

The Food and Agriculture Organization (FAO) reported that: "The total carbon stock in forests decreased from 668 gigatonnes in 1990 to 662 gigatonnes in 2020". In Canada's boreal forests as much as 80% of the total carbon is stored in the soils as dead organic matter.

The IPCC Sixth Assessment Report says: "Secondary forest regrowth and restoration of degraded forests and non-forest ecosystems can play a large role in carbon sequestration (high confidence) with high resilience to disturbances and additional benefits such as enhanced biodiversity."

Impacts on temperature are affected by the location of the forest. For example, reforestation in boreal or subarctic regions has less impact on climate. This is because it substitutes a high-albedo, snow-dominated region with a lower-albedo forest canopy. By contrast, tropical reforestation projects lead to a positive change such as the formation of clouds. These clouds then reflect the sunlight, lowering temperatures.

Planting trees in tropical climates with wet seasons has another advantage. In such a setting, trees grow more quickly (fixing more carbon) because they can grow year-round. Trees in tropical climates have, on average, larger, brighter, and more abundant leaves than non-tropical climates. A study of the girth of 70,000 trees across Africa has shown that tropical forests fix more carbon dioxide pollution than previously realized. The research suggested almost one-fifth of fossil fuel emissions are absorbed by forests across Africa, Amazonia and Asia. Simon Lewis stated, "Tropical forest trees are absorbing about 18% of the carbon dioxide added to the atmosphere each year from burning fossil fuels, substantially buffering the rate of change."

== By region ==
Planted forests account for 8% of the total forest area, covering an estimated 312 million ha in 2025. The largest area of planted forests is in Asia, at 146 million ha, where this forest type represents 23% of the total forest area (the largest proportion of any region). The area of planted forests has increased in all regions (by a total of 120 million ha) since 1990, but, globally, the rate of increase slowed between 2015 - 2025. Intensively managed plantation forests account for about half the total planted-forest area worldwide. The largest share of this category of planted forests is in South America, where it constitutes nearly 100% of all planted forests. Almost all plantation forests (95%) in South America are composed of introduced species. Europe has the lowest share of plantation forest, at about 6% of the total area of planted forests.

== By country ==
=== Australia ===
Australian forests have been heavily affected since European colonisation, and some attempts have been made to restore native habitats, both by government and individuals. Greening Australia is a national Non profit set up to run the "National Tree Program" initiated by the Federal Government in 1982.

There is a strong volunteer movement for conservation in Australia through Landcare and other networks. National Tree Day is organised annually by Planet Ark in the last week in July, encouraging the public to plant 1 million native trees per year. Growing trees for Timber industries is a long-term project. It may take many years for a tree to mature to an age and size that is appropriate for the Timber to be used by industry. Some trees are many hundreds of years old.

Many state governments run their own "Million Tree" programs each year to encourage community involvement.

=== Bangladesh ===
45,000 tree saplings will be planted on rural roads in Bangladesh. Legal agreements will ensure that 60% tree wealth created will belong to the poorest families (45 km × 15 = 675 families). Local government and PEP each receive 20% tree wealth. 45 poor rural women & 3 local social workers will be employed for 3 years to nurture the young saplings, receiving a monthly salary. With only 8% of the desired 25% land under tree coverage, the project will improve the environment.

=== Canada ===
Most tree planting in Canada is carried out by private reforestation companies. Tree-planting is typically piece work and tree prices can vary widely depending on the difficulty of the terrain and on the winning contract's bid price. As a result, there is a saying among planters: "There is no bad land, only bad contracts." 4 months of hard work can yield enough to live on for an entire year, but conditions are harsh.

Tree planting crews often do not permanently reside in the areas where they work, thus much planting is based out of motels or bush camps. Bush camp accommodations usually consist of a mess tent, cook shack, dry goods tent, first aid tent, freshly dug outhouses, and a shower tent or trailer. Planters are responsible for bringing either a tent or car to sleep in. A camp also contains camp cooks and support staff.

The average British Columbian planter plants 1,600 trees per day, but it is not uncommon for experienced planters to plant up to 4,000 trees per day while working in the interior.These numbers are higher in central and eastern Canada, where the terrain is generally faster, however the price per tree is slightly lower as a result. Average daily totals of 2,500 are common, with experienced planters planting upwards of 5,000 trees a day. Numbers as high as 7,500 a day have been recorded.

Quite often, tree planting contractors will deduct some of the cost associated with the operation of the contract directly from the tree planter's daily earned wages. These imposed fees typically vary from $10 to $30 per day, and are referred to as "camp costs".

Once inflation is factored in, real tree planter earnings have declined for many years in Canada. This has adversely affected the sector's ability to attract and retain workers.

Based on statistics for British Columbia, the average tree planter: lifts a cumulative weight of over 1,000 kilograms (2,200 lb), bends more than 200 times per hour, drives the shovel into the ground more than 200 times per hour and travels over 16 kilometres (9.9 mi) with a heavy load, every day of the entire season. The reforestation industry in the United States has an average annual injury rate of approximately 17 claims per 100 workers, per year. It is often difficult and sometimes dangerous.

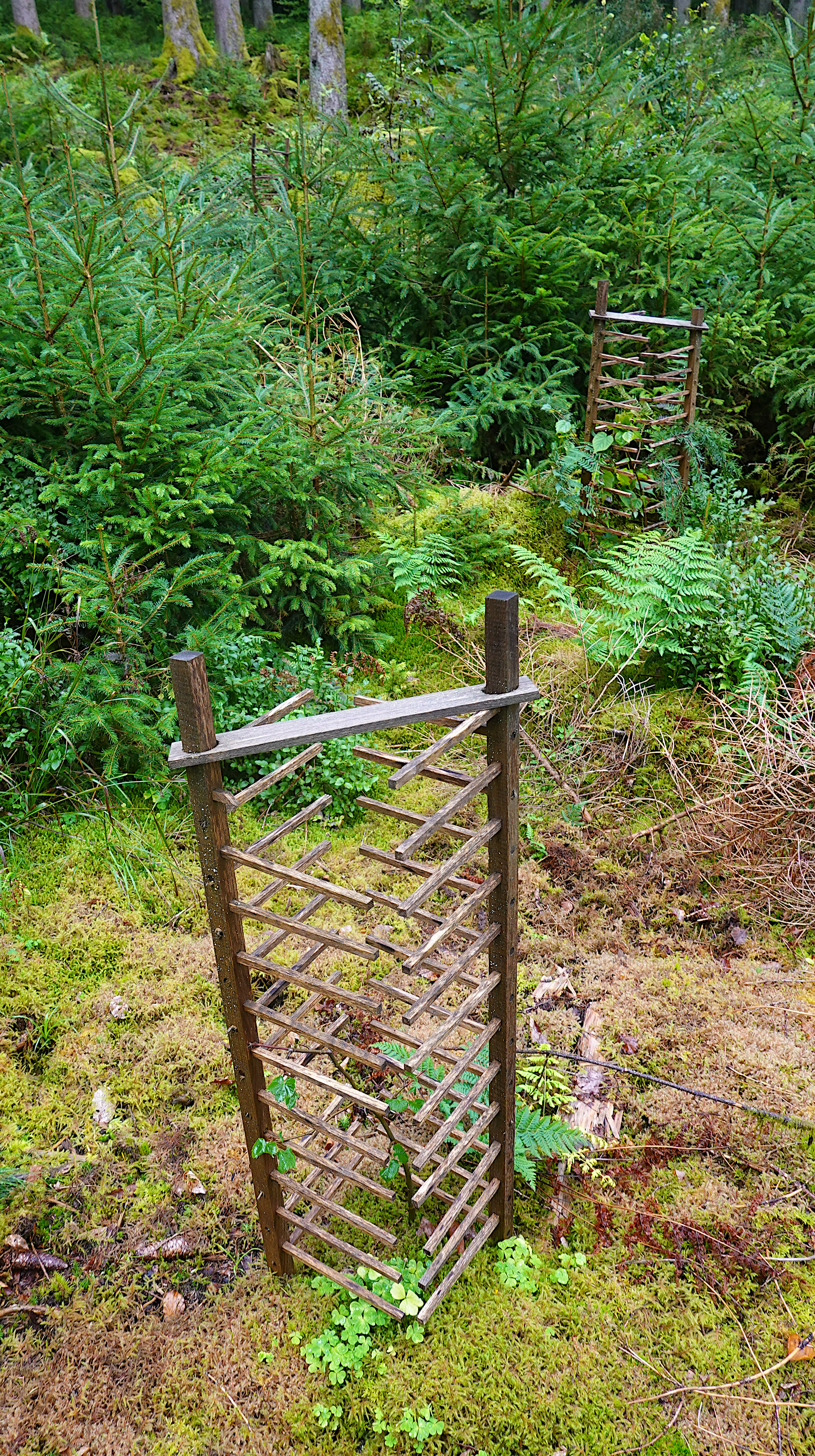
Traditional tree protectors in the Black Forest, Germany.

=== Germany ===
In 2024 Germany's Federal Cabinet adopted the National Biodiversity Strategy 2030 as part of its commitment to the 2022 UN Biodiversity Conference. The Forestry Action Area covers species protection and ecosystem restoration, aiming to increase forest cover by 10,000 hectares, and increase natural forest cover by 5%.

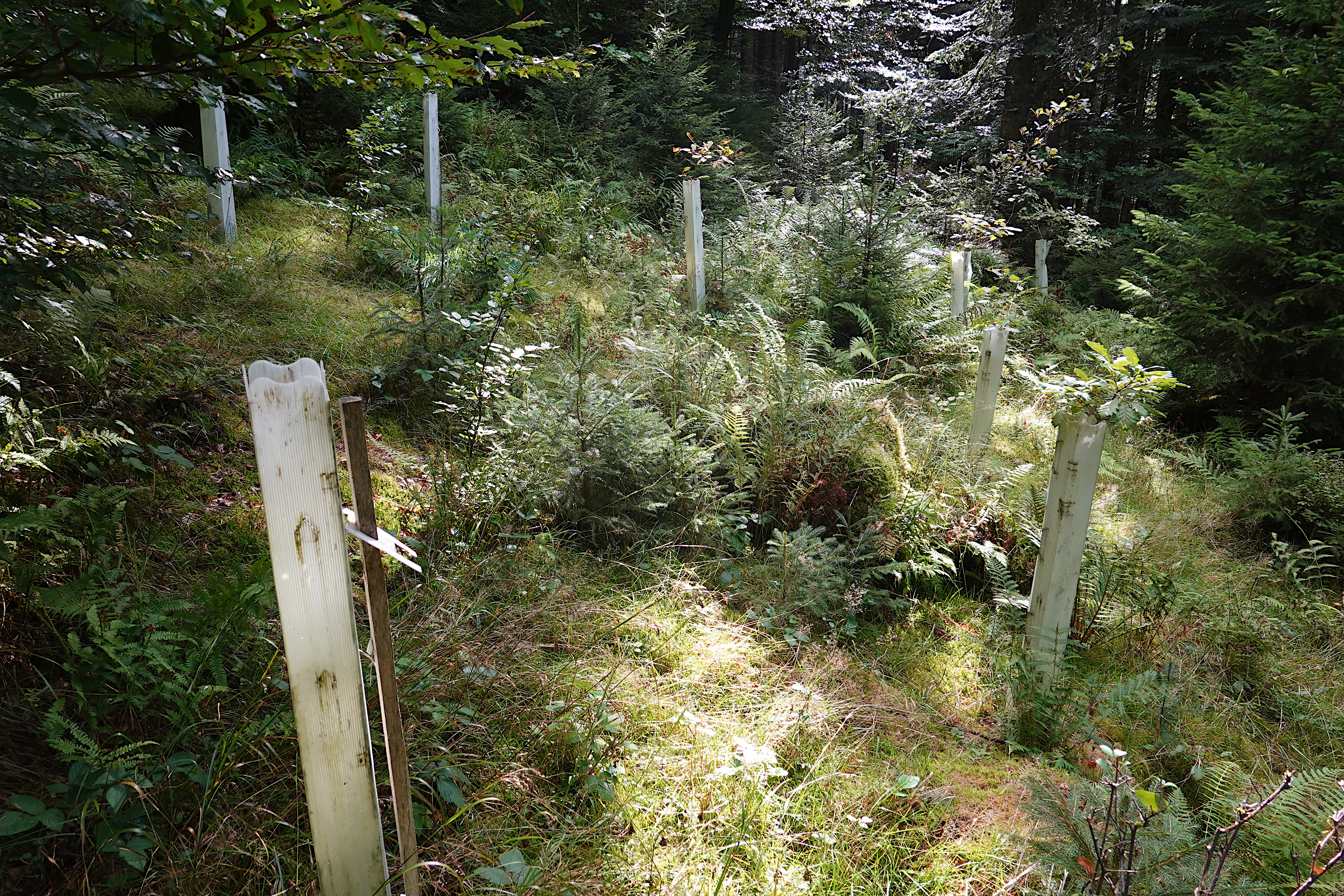
Plastic tree protectors in the Black Forest, Germany.

=== United Kingdom ===
Planting in the UK is commonly referred to as restocking, when it takes place on land that has recently been harvested. When occurring on previously unforested land it is known as new planting.Under the British system, in order to acquire the necessary permissions to clearcut, the landowner must agree a management plan with the Forestry Commission (the regulatory body for all things forestry) which must include proposals for the re-establishment of tree cover on the land. Planting contractors will be engaged by the landowner/management company, a contract drawn up and work will typically take place from November to April when most of the transplants are dormant. However, this date range might be affected due to climate change.

Planting is part of the rotational nature of much British plantation forestry. Productive tree crops are planted and subsequently clearcut. Some form of soil cultivation may take place and the ground is then restocked. Where the production of timber is a management priority, a prescribed stocking density must be achieved. For coniferous species this will be a minimum of 2500 stems per hectare at year 5 (from planting). Planting at this density has been shown to favour the development of straighter knot-free logs.

Planters are normally paid under piece work terms and an experienced worker will plant around 1500-2000 trees a day under most conditions.

=== India ===
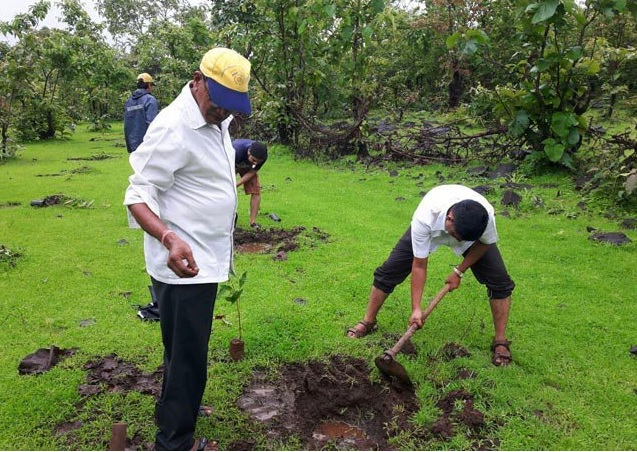
Tree Plantation Drive by Shree Aniruddha Upasana Foundation, Mumbai, India.

Tree Plantation drives combat many environmental issues like deforestation, erosion of soil, desertification in semi-arid areas, global warming and hence enhancing the beauty and balance of the environment. Trees absorb harmful gases and emit oxygen resulting in an increase in oxygen supply.

On average, a single tree emits 260 pounds of oxygen annually. Similarly, a fully-grown tree is sufficient for 18 human beings in one acre of land in one year stressing the importance of tree plantation for mankind. Aniruddha's Academy of Disaster Management in Mumbai, India carries out numerous projects to plant trees on a huge scale. The foundation trains volunteer on this subject at Govidyapeetham (Cattle Conservation Institute) in the city of Karjat in Maharashtra, India. The trained volunteers then plant saplings, trees in groups on available land. Local government authorities also provide vacant plots, land on highways sides and on the hills for tree plantation.

Ek Kadam Sansthan of Jaipur, India is involved in many plantation projects including one tree my duty to plant trees on the earth. The Ek Kadam plant trees and hand them over to the individual at the village, who meets beneficiary criteria like they are financially challenged, physically challenged etc. After handing over the process Sansthan pays them 100 INR per tree for watering and safety from grazing cattle. Hence by this process Ek Kadam sansthan want to ensure 100% survivability of planted trees. Many volunteers are added to this campaign. The trained volunteers help Ek Kadam Sansthan to plant saplings, and managing all processes. Ek Kadam Sansthan not taking any support from government agencies. The management committee is regularised and managed by retired bureaucrats to ensure transparency in funds and performance measures.

Ek Kadam Sansthan's campaign One Tree My Duty is working with technology-enabled tree plantation work.

=== Iran ===
In 2021, the Iranian government launched a national initiative to expand tree cover called The One Billion Tree Planting Program.

=== Israel ===
See: Jewish National Fund#Afforestation; List of forests in Israel.

Tree-planting is an ancient Jewish tradition. The Talmudic rabbi Yohanan ben Zakai used to say that if a person planting a tree heard that the Messiah had arrived, he should finish planting before going to greet him. Due to massive afforestation efforts, this fact echoed in diverse campaigns. Israeli forests are the product of a major afforestation campaign by the Jewish National Fund (JNF).

The largest planted forest in Israel is Yatir Forest, located on the southern slopes of Mount Hebron, on the edge of the Negev Desert. It covers an area of 30,000 dunams (30 square kilometers). It is named after the ancient Levite city within its territory, Yatir, as written in the Torah: "And unto the children of Aaron the priest they gave Hebron with its suburbs, the city of refuge for the manslayer, and Libnah with its suburbs, and Jattir with its suburbs, and Eshtemoa with its suburbs" (Book of Joshua 21:13–14). In 2006, the JNF signed a 49-year lease agreement with the State of Israel which gives it control over 30,000 hectares of Negev land for the development of forests. Research on climate change is being carried out in Yatir Forest. Studies of the Weizmann Institute of Science, in collaboration with the Desert Research Institute at Sde Boker, have shown that the trees function as a trap for carbon in the air. Shade provided by trees planted in the desert also reduces evaporation of the sparse rainfall. Yatir Forest is a part of the NASA project FluxNet, a global network of micrometeorological tower sites used to measure the exchanges of carbon dioxide, water vapor, and energy between terrestrial ecosystem and atmosphere. The Arava Institute for Environmental Studies conducts research that focuses on crops such as dates and grapes grown in the vicinity of Yatir forest. The research is part of a project aimed at introducing new crops into arid and saline zones.

The JNF has been criticized for planting non-native pine trees which are unsuited to the climate, rather than local species such as olive trees. Others say that JNF deserves credit for this decision, and the forests would not have survived otherwise. According to JNF statistics, six out of every 10 saplings planted at a JNF site in Jerusalem do not survive, although the survival rate for planting sites outside Jerusalem is much higher – close to 95 percent.

=== New Zealand ===
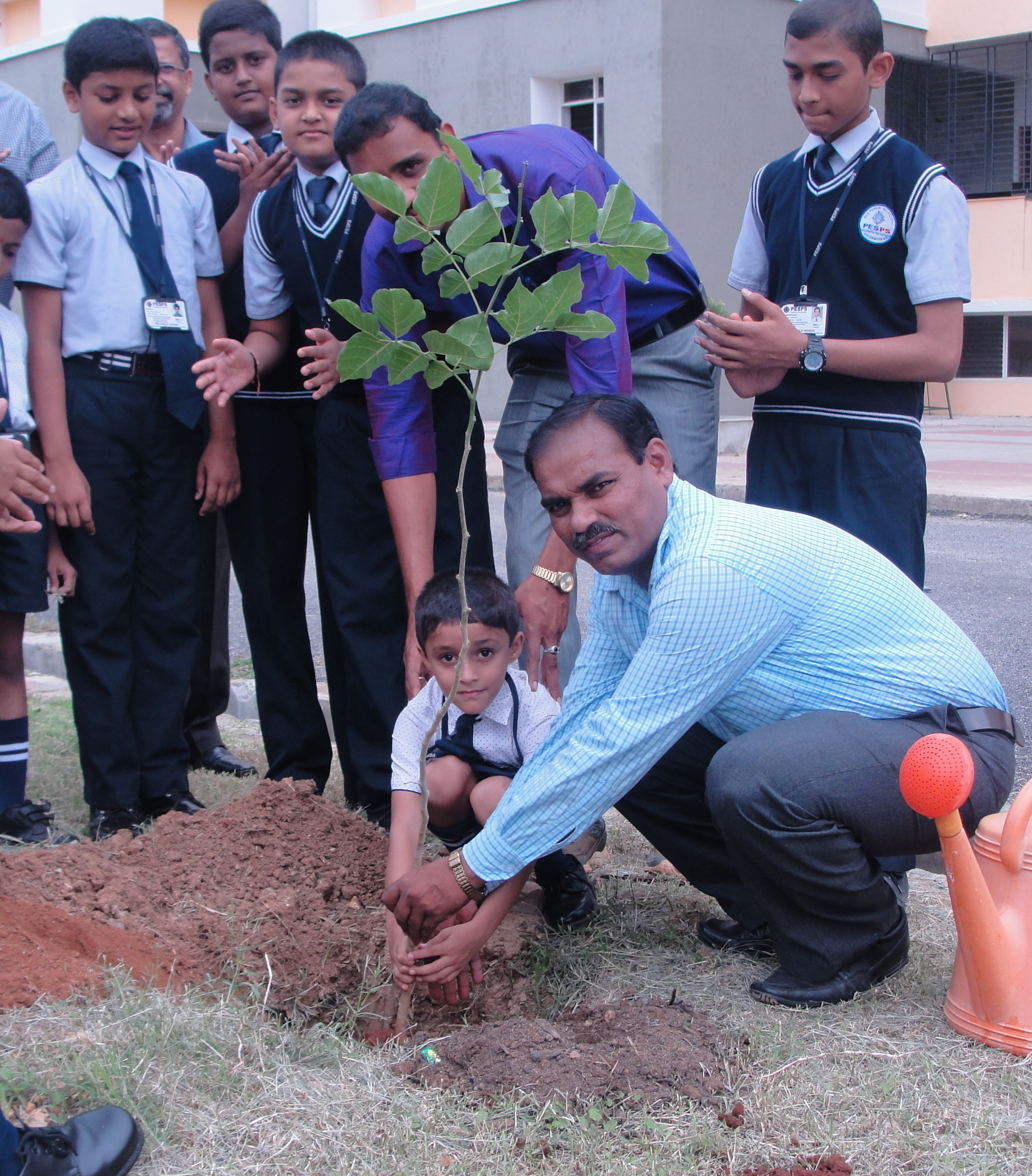
Tree planting by a boy in India

Kaingaroa Forest in New Zealand is the second largest planted forest in the southern hemisphere after the Sabie/Graskop area in South Africa. It is one of the many plantation forests planted since European settlement. The Monterey pine (Pinus radiata) is commonly used for plantations since a fast-growing cultivar suitable for a wide range of conditions has been developed.

Government agencies, environmental organisations, and private trusts carry out tree planting for conservation and climate change mitigation. While some work is carried out by private enterprise, there are also planting days organised for volunteers. Landcare Research use planted forests for their EBEX21 system for greenhouse gas emissions mitigations.

=== South Africa ===
South Africa's forests have been a heavily depleted mostly due to agriculture, traditional farming and urbanisation in the coastal regions. Various organizations are working on increasing the forest cover in parts of the country. Currently there is less than 0.5% forest cover in South Africa. Wildlands Conservation Trust and Food & Trees for Africa (FTFA) are some of the oldest NGOs working to plant trees throughout South Africa—both established in the early 1990s. Greenpop is a national Social Enterprise established in 2010 which focusses on tree planting in sustainable urban greening and forest restoration in Sub-Saharan Africa. There is a strong volunteer movement for conservation in South Africa. National Tree Day or Arbor Day is organised annually in September, and has gone on to become national Arbor Month.

The largest planted forest in the Southern Hemisphere is located in the Sabie/Graskop area in South Africa and covers approximately 6,000 km^{2}.

=== United States ===
Hand planting is the most widely practiced planting method in the United States. Hand planting is possible on most terrain, in most soil conditions, and around obstacles. Equipment for hand planting is inexpensive, but hand planting is labor-intensive resulting in costs that are generally 20% to 50% greater than those of machine planting. Hand planting is an attractive option for landowners and conservation organizations planting small acreages; especially if volunteer labor is available. Seedling survival rates will vary based on planters' experience levels. In the U.S., common hand planting tools include dibbles, mattocks, augers, and hoedads that are paired with a hip or shoulder harness style planting bag.

Machine planting is another common planting method in the United States. Equipment and transportation costs are such that machine planting is generally used for larger acreages where reduced labor cost and high planting productivity are desired. Machine planting is generally restricted to reasonably level terrain with good soil and limited obstacles. While machine planting is most often associated with plantation silviculture in the Southeast and Upper Midwest, it has been used in ecological restoration. Machine planting was used for forest restoration on Alaska's Kenai Peninsula following a large scale Spruce Bark Beetle outbreak in the 1990s.

Trees for the Future and Plant With Purpose are non-profit organizations based in the U.S. that plant trees in developing countries to improve land management. Other organizations that plant trees in the United States include:

- American Forests
- Planting Shade: Student run non-profit based in Virginia Beach. Gives citizens the resources to plant trees in their own backyard and other residential areas.
- Arbor Day Foundation
- Nature Conservancy
- Plant-it 2020
- USDA Forest Service "Plant-A-Tree" program in which a person can donate to plant trees in the National Forests.
- Our City Forest
- TreeFolks empowers central Texans to build stronger communities through planting and caring for trees. Since 1989, TreeFolks has planted over 3 million trees in parks, neighborhoods, and natural areas throughout central Texas.

== History ==
Planted forest as a percentage of total forest area, by region, 2025.

Trees have been selectively planted by mankind for thousands of years the world over to provide food, shelter, timber, and other tree products as well as for ornamental and ceremonial purposes. The first woody species planted was probably olive in southeast Europe in 4000BC. There are also many biblical references to tree planting, such as in the Old Testament record of Abraham planting a tamarisk to commemorate the treaty of Beersheba (Gen. 21:33).

The concept of planting multiple trees together on a large scale to replenish material supplies first developed in Europe during the Middle Ages, and gradually gave rise to forestry plantations. The earliest records of conifer plantations come from Nuremberg in 1368, although the planting of trees on a large scale may have taken place as early as the 13th century in this region to reafforest exploited areas.

As Neolithic humans assumed a more settled way of life, and with the technological development of agriculture and consequent growth of civilization, more trees would need to be felled and gathered as a source of timber and other forest products and to make way for cultivation of crops. Given the finiteness of tree products in the absence of sufficient replanting, it was realized that clearance of forest and woodland must be controlled, and forests had to be managed and conserved for the natural resources they provided as demand grew. In England for example, this is evident from early laws that were passed in 1457 to encourage tree planting. However, despite these laws, persistent destruction of woodlands since the Anglo-Saxon period had by the seventeenth century led to a so-called "timber famine". Because of this shortfall, timber was at a premium and thus became very expensive, which was especially problematic for shipbuilding and naval enterprises. Following an appeal by the Navy Board to the Royal Society for a solution, one member of the Society, John Evelyn, wrote and published his seminal 1664 work Sylva, or A Discourse of Forest-Trees and the Propagation of Timber. This conveyed a successful plea for reafforestation by persuading landowners to plant millions of trees on their private estates to make good the severe shortage of timber and repair the "wooden walls" of England.

In the tropics, there is a long history of planting teak for timber, dating back to the 15th century in Java. The demand for sustainable teak for general construction and shipbuilding purposes intensified with the arrival of the Portuguese in the 15th century and the Dutch in the 17th century. The teak growing industry thereafter became controlled and monopolized by the Dutch East India Company.

In North America, tree planting on the western prairies was practiced by immigrants from the east during the 19th century. This was to satisfy the demand for wood and other tree products as well as to establish shelterbelts for agriculture, since naturally growing trees were very scarce on the Great Plains.

== See also ==
- Agroforestry
- Arbor Day
- Arboretum
- Billion Tree Campaign
- Ecosia
- Farmer-managed natural regeneration
- Forest restoration
- Great Green Wall (Africa)
- Hoedad (tool)
- Hoedads Reforestation Cooperative
- Johnny Appleseed
- Lists of trees
- Mattock
- Million Tree Initiative
- Multipurpose tree
- Planet Ark
- Plant-for-the-Planet
- Pottiputki
- Propagation of Christmas trees
- Reducing emissions from deforestation and forest degradation
- Tree care
- Tree planting bar
- Trillion Tree Campaign
- Tu Bishvat
- Tubestock
- Urban forest
- Urban forestry
- Urban reforestation

== Sources ==
This article incorporates text from a free content work. Licensed under CC BY 4.0 (license statement/permission). Text taken from Global Forest Resources Assessment 2025, Food and Agriculture Organization of the United Nations (FAO).
