= Khirbet Nij'm =

- خربة نجم (Arabic)
- Location within the West Bank
- 31.827617°N 35.130329°E
- Type: Fortress and caravanserai
- Periods: Persian–Hellenistic and Ottoman
- Location: Har Adar, West Bank

Site notes
- Excavation dates: 1991
- Archaeologists: Michael Dadon

Khirbet Nij'm (Arabic: خربة نجم, lit. 'ruin of the star'; Hebrew: ח'רבת ניג'ם) is an archaeological site on the hill of Givat ha-Radar at Har Adar, in the West Bank. Salvage excavations carried out at the site uncovered a fortified structure identified as a fortress of the Persian–Hellenistic period, which was later reused as an Ottoman-period caravanserai (khan).

== Location and history ==
Givat ha-Radar lies within Har Adar, a settlement and local council in the West Bank, and rises to 880 m above sea level. The site was uncovered between May and July 1991 during development work for Har Adar, in a salvage excavation directed by Michael Dadon on behalf of the Staff Officer for Archaeology in Judea and Samaria. It sits on a spur descending westward between two tributaries of Nahal Kfira. A large building complex containing two strata was exposed.

== Persian–Hellenistic structure ==
The earliest stratum is dated to the Persian period, when a fortified building — apparently a fortress standing along the northern border of Judea — was erected. The fortress measured 21.8 × 25.8 m, with a series of rooms surrounding an inner courtyard (11.9 × 10.0 m) that contained a water cistern. The 2.2 m-wide entrance was set in the east and was indirect, passing through two rooms to reach the central courtyard. In the Hellenistic period the building served as a farmhouse; incised decorations typical of the period survive on its plastered walls.

== Finds ==
Metal finds include needles, an iron mattock and a bronze signet ring depicting a cultic scene of two figures and an altar. The pottery comprises kraters, cooking pots, jars, jugs, a juglet and lamps of the Persian and early Hellenistic periods. A silver tetradrachm of Philip III Arrhidaeus, struck around 317 BCE and showing the head of the young Heracles and a seated Zeus, was found on the floor of the Persian–Hellenistic stratum.

== Ottoman khan ==
The Persian–Hellenistic building was abandoned in the first half of the 2nd century BCE. In the Ottoman period the ancient structure was reused: it was enlarged and remodelled, its area extended to about 1,200 m² by the addition of service and industrial rooms. The building served as a khan on the road between the Nabi Samwil area and Abu Ghosh; tabun ovens used to warm travellers were found in most of the rooms. A large walled courtyard fronted the building, with storerooms in the southern wing and an adjacent winepress. Ottoman-period finds include a furnace for smelting metal, Ottoman smoking pipes and coins, among them perforated coins reused as ornaments, dated to the reign of Mahmud I (1730) and minted in Constantinople.
