= Afforestation =

Establishment of trees where there were none previously

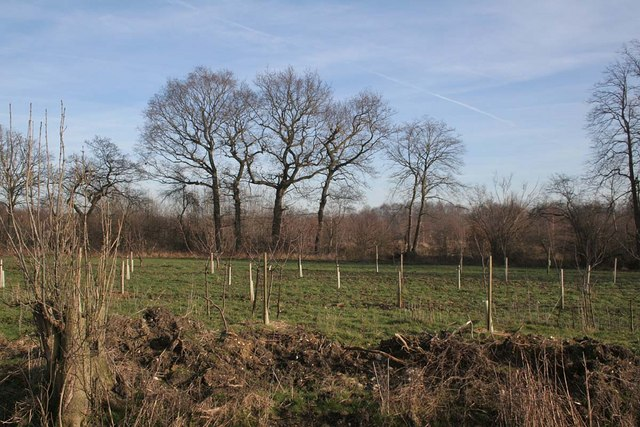
An afforestation project in Rand Wood, Lincolnshire, England (this patch was open ground before)

Annual afforestation

Afforestation is the establishment of a forest or stand of trees in an area where there was no recent tree cover. There are three types of afforestation: natural regeneration, agroforestry and tree plantations. In the context of climate change, afforestation can be helpful for climate change mitigation through the route of carbon sequestration. Afforestation can also improve the local climate through increased rainfall and by being a barrier against high winds. The additional trees can also prevent or reduce topsoil erosion (from water and wind), floods and landslides. Finally, additional trees can be a habitat for wildlife, and provide employment and wood products.

In comparison, reforestation means re-establishing forest that have either been cut down or lost due to natural causes, such as fire, storm, etc. Nowadays, the boundaries between afforestation and reforestation projects can be blurred as it may not be so clear what was there before at what point in time.

An essential aspect of successful afforestation efforts lies in the careful selection of tree species that are well-suited to the local climate and soil conditions. By choosing appropriate species, afforested areas can better withstand the impacts of climate change.

Earth offers enough room to plant an additional 0.9 billion ha of tree canopy cover. Planting and protecting them would sequester 205 billion tons of carbon which is about 20 years of current global carbon emissions. This level of sequestration would represent about 25% of the atmosphere's current carbon pool. However, there has been debate about whether afforestation is beneficial for the sustainable use of natural resources, with some researchers pointing out that tree planting is not the only way to enhance climate mitigation and CO_{2} capture. Non-forest areas, such as grasslands and savannas, also benefit the biosphere and humanity, and they need a different management strategy - they are not supposed to be forests.

Afforestation critics argue that ecosystems without trees are not necessarily degraded, and many of them can store carbon as they are; for example, savannas and tundra store carbon underground. Carbon sequestration estimates in these areas often do not include the total amount of carbon reductions in soils and slowing tree growth over time. Afforestation can also negatively affect biodiversity by increasing fragmentation and edge effects on the habitat outside the planted area.

Australia, Canada, China, India, Israel, United States and Europe have afforestation programs to increase carbon dioxide removal in forests and in some cases to reduce desertification.

== Definition ==
The term afforestation means establishing new forest on lands that were not forest before (e.g. abandoned agriculture). The same definition in other words states that afforestation is "conversion to forest of land that historically has not contained forests".

In comparison, reforestation means the "conversion to forest of land that has previously contained forests but that has been converted to some other use".

== Types of afforestation ==
There are three types of afforestation:

1. Natural regeneration (where native trees are planted as seeds; this creates new ecosystems and increases carbon sequestration).
2. Agroforestry (this is essentially an agricultural activity carried out in order to grow harvestable crops such as fruits and nuts).
3. Tree plantations (carried out in order to produce wood and wood-pulp products; this can be seen as an alternative to cutting down naturally occurring forests).

However, the term afforestation can also "imply the intentional conversion of native non-forest ecosystems to exotic tree cover and violate biodiversity safeguards".

== Procedure ==
The process of afforestation begins with site selection. Several environmental factors of the site must be analyzed, including climate, soil, vegetation, and human activity. These factors will determine the quality of the site, what species of trees should be planted, and what planting method should be used.

After the forest site has been assessed, the area must be prepared for planting. Preparation can involve a variety of mechanical or chemical methods, such as chopping, mounding, bedding, herbicides, and prescribed burning. Once the site is prepared, planting can take place. One method for planting is direct seeding, which involves sowing seeds directly into the forest floor. Another is seedling planting, which is similar to direct seeding except that seedlings already have an established root system. Afforestation by cutting is an option for tree species that can reproduce asexually, where a piece of a tree stem, branch, root, or leaves can be planted onto the forest floor and sprout successfully. Sometimes special tools, such as a tree planting bar, are used to make planting of trees easier and faster.

An essential aspect of successful afforestation efforts lies in the careful selection of tree species that are well-suited to the local climate and soil conditions. By choosing appropriate species, afforested areas can better withstand the impacts of climate change.

== Benefits ==
There are several benefits from afforestation such as carbon sequestration, increasing rainfall, prevention of topsoil erosion (from water and wind), flood and landslide mitigation, barriers against high winds, shelter for wildlife, employment and alternative sources of wood products.

Afforestation projects create employment opportunities, particularly in rural areas, thus promoting sustainable livelihoods. They can create many jobs in various forest-related activities.

=== Climate change mitigation ===
Proportion of carbon stock in forest carbon pools, 2020

Total forest carbon stock, by carbon pool, 2025.

Forests are an important part of the global carbon cycle because trees and plants absorb carbon dioxide through photosynthesis. Therefore, they play an important role in climate change mitigation. By removing the greenhouse gas CO_{2} from the air, forests function as terrestrial carbon sinks, meaning they store large amounts of carbon in the form of biomass, encompassing roots, stems, branches, and leaves. By doing so, forests sequester approximately 25% of human carbon emissions annually, playing a critical role in Earth's climate. Throughout their lifespan, trees continue to sequester carbon, storing atmospheric CO_{2} long-term. Sustainable forest management, afforestation, reforestation are therefore important contributions to climate change mitigation.

An important consideration in such efforts is that forests can turn from sinks to carbon sources. In 2019 forests took up a third less carbon than they did in the 1990s, due to higher temperatures, droughts and deforestation. National-scale forest inventory data also shows trends from 1999 to 2020 that some forests were already approaching climate thresholds shifting them from carbon sinks to carbon sources. The typical tropical forest may become a carbon source by the 2060s.

Researchers have found that, in terms of environmental services, it is better to avoid deforestation than to allow for deforestation to subsequently reforest, as the latter leads to irreversible effects in terms of biodiversity loss and soil degradation. Furthermore, the probability that legacy carbon will be released from soil is higher in a younger boreal forest. In particular, boreal forests have been noted to support the growth of Armillaria (honey fungus), which is a root pathogen that breaks down compounds necessary for wood integrity, increasing the likelihood of carbon release. Global greenhouse gas emissions caused by damage to tropical rainforests may have been substantially underestimated until around 2019. Additionally, the effects of afforestation and reforestation will be farther in the future than keeping existing forests intact. It takes much longer − several decades − for the benefits for global warming to manifest to the same carbon sequestration benefits from mature trees in tropical forests and hence from limiting deforestation. Therefore, scientists consider "the protection and recovery of carbon-rich and long-lived ecosystems, especially natural forests" to be "the major climate solution".

The planting of trees on marginal crop and pasture lands helps to incorporate carbon from atmospheric CO_{2} into biomass. For this carbon sequestration process to succeed the carbon must not return to the atmosphere from biomass burning or rotting when the trees die. Several species of Ficus such as Ficus wakefieldii have been observed to sequester atmospheric CO_{2} as calcium oxalate in the presence of oxalotrophic bacteria and fungi, which catabolize the oxalate, which produces calcium carbonate. The calcium carbonate is precipitated throughout the tree, which also alkalinizes the surrounding soil. These species are current candidates for carbon sequestration in agroforestry. Another example for an oxalogene tree is Brosimum alicastrum. This Calcium-oxalate fixation process was first observed in the Iroko tree, which can sequester up to a ton of calcium carbonate in the soil over its lifespan. Also Cacti, such as the Saguaro, transfer carbon from the biological cycle to the geological cycle by forming the mineral calcium carbonate.

Earth offers enough room to plant an additional 0.9 billion ha of tree canopy cover, although this estimate has been criticized, and the true area that has a net cooling effect on the climate when accounting for biophysical feedbacks like albedo is 20-80% lower. Planting and protecting these trees would sequester 205 billion tons of carbon if the trees survive future climate stress to reach maturity. To put this number into perspective, this is about 20 years of current global carbon emissions (as of 2019) . This level of sequestration would represent about 25% of the atmosphere's carbon pool in 2019.

Life expectancy of forests varies throughout the world, influenced by tree species, site conditions, and natural disturbance patterns. In some forests, carbon may be stored for centuries, while in other forests, carbon is released with frequent stand replacing fires. Forests that are harvested prior to stand replacing events allow for the retention of carbon in manufactured forest products such as lumber. However, only a portion of the carbon removed from logged forests ends up as durable goods and buildings. The remainder ends up as sawmill by-products such as pulp, paper, and pallets. If all new construction globally utilized 90% wood products, largely via adoption of mass timber in low rise construction, this could sequester 700 million net tons of carbon per year. This is in addition to the elimination of carbon emissions from the displaced construction material such as steel or concrete, which are carbon-intense to produce.

A meta-analysis found that mixed species plantations would increase carbon storage alongside other benefits of diversifying planted forests.

Although a bamboo forest stores less total carbon than a mature forest of trees, a bamboo plantation sequesters carbon at a much faster rate than a mature forest or a tree plantation. Therefore, the farming of bamboo timber may have significant carbon sequestration potential.

The Food and Agriculture Organization (FAO) reported that: "The total carbon stock in forests decreased from 668 gigatonnes in 1990 to 662 gigatonnes in 2020". In Canada's boreal forests as much as 80% of the total carbon is stored in the soils as dead organic matter.

The IPCC Sixth Assessment Report says: "Secondary forest regrowth and restoration of degraded forests and non-forest ecosystems can play a large role in carbon sequestration (high confidence) with high resilience to disturbances and additional benefits such as enhanced biodiversity."

Impacts on temperature are affected by the location of the forest. For example, reforestation in boreal or subarctic regions has less impact on climate. This is because it substitutes a high-albedo, snow-dominated region with a lower-albedo forest canopy. By contrast, tropical reforestation projects lead to a positive change such as the formation of clouds. These clouds then reflect the sunlight, lowering temperatures.

Planting trees in tropical climates with wet seasons has another advantage. In such a setting, trees grow more quickly (fixing more carbon) because they can grow year-round. Trees in tropical climates have, on average, larger, brighter, and more abundant leaves than non-tropical climates. A study of the girth of 70,000 trees across Africa has shown that tropical forests fix more carbon dioxide pollution than previously realized. The research suggested almost one-fifth of fossil fuel emissions are absorbed by forests across Africa, Amazonia and Asia. Simon Lewis stated, "Tropical forest trees are absorbing about 18% of the carbon dioxide added to the atmosphere each year from burning fossil fuels, substantially buffering the rate of change."

=== Environmental benefits ===
Afforestation provides other environmental benefits, including increasing the soil quality and its organic carbon levels, reducing the risk of erosion and desertification. The planting of trees in urban areas is also able to reduce air pollution via the trees' absorption and filtration of pollutants, including carbon monoxide, sulfur dioxide, and ozone, in addition to CO_{2}.

Afforestation protects the biodiversity of plants and animals which allows the sustenance of ecosystems that provide clean air, soil fertilization, etc. Forests support biodiversity conservation, providing habitats for about 80% of the world's biodiversity and contributing to ecosystem restoration and resilience. Water management can be improved afforestation, as trees regulate hydrological cycles, reduce soil erosion, and prevent water runoff. Their capacity to capture and store water helps in mitigating floods and droughts.

Forests act as natural air filters, absorbing pollutants and improving air quality. Urban forestation projects have been successful in reducing respiratory illnesses and enhancing overall air quality in cities. Trees provide shade and cooling effects. By shading and evaporation, forests can lower local temperatures, offering a more comfortable environment in urban areas and reducing the impact of extreme heat.

== Criticism ==
=== Afforestation in grasslands and savanna ===
Tree-planting campaigns are criticised for sometimes targeting areas where forests would not naturally occur, such as grassland and savanna biomes. Carbon sequestration forecasts of afforestation programmes often insufficiently consider possible carbon reductions in soils as well as slowing tree growth over time.

=== Impact on biodiversity ===
Afforestation can negatively affect biodiversity through increasing fragmentation and edge effects for the habitat remaining outside the planted area. New forest plantations can introduce generalist predators that would otherwise not be found in open habitat into the covered area, which could detrimentally increase predation rates on the native species of the area. A study by scientists at the British Trust for Ornithology into the decline of British populations of Eurasian curlew found that afforestation had impacted curlew populations through fragmentation of their naturally open grassland habitats and increases in generalist predators. At the same time, In Europe studies have demonstrated beneficial effects on landscape level diversity when strategically located on agricultural landscapes.

=== Surface albedo ===
Questions have also been raised in the scientific community regarding how global afforestation could affect the surface albedo of Earth. The canopy cover of mature trees could make the surface albedo darker, which causes more heat to be absorbed, potentially raising the temperature of the planet. This is particularly relevant in parts of the world with high levels of snow cover, due to the significant difference in albedo between highly reflective white snow and darker forest cover which absorbs more solar radiation.

=== Monoculture ===
One significant criticism of reforestation or afforestation efforts that rely on monocultures of - usually conifer - trees is that, while they may increase tree cover, they fail to provide the diverse and complex habitat needed by most woodland creatures. Monocultures, often planted for commercial purposes or ease of management, lack the biodiversity of natural forests. These single-species forests provide limited food sources, shelter, and nesting sites for a wide range of wildlife, and in purely coniferous forests low levels of light may reach the forest floor reducing habitat and variety of plant life. Many woodland creatures, such as birds, mammals, and insects, rely on a variety of tree species and plant life for survival, and the uniformity of monocultures does not support these varied ecological needs. As a result, such reforestation or afforestation efforts may unintentionally create environments that are unsuitable for the very species they aim to protect, thus undermining broader conservation goals.

== Examples ==
=== Africa ===
The Great Green Wall of Africa is a ~5,000 mile forest being planted across the continent to stop the spread of the Sahara Desert to the south.

=== Australia ===
In Adelaide, South Australia (a city of 1.3 million as of June 2016), Premier Mike Rann (2002 to 2011) launched an urban forest initiative in 2003 to plant 3 million native trees and shrubs by 2014 on 300 project sites across the metro area. Thousands of Adelaide citizens participated in community planting days on sites including parks, reserves, transport corridors, schools, water courses and coastline. Only native trees were planted to ensure genetic integrity. Rann said the project aimed to beautify and cool the city and make it more livable, improve air and water quality, and reduce Adelaide's greenhouse gas emissions by 600,000 tonnes of CO_{2} per year.

=== Canada ===
In 2003, the government of Canada created a four-year project called the Forest 2020 Plantation Development and Assessment Initiative, which involved planting 6000 ha of fast-growing forests on non-forested lands countrywide. These plantations were used to analyze how afforestation can help to increase carbon sequestration and mitigate greenhouse gas (GHG) emissions while also considering the economic and investment attractiveness of afforestation. The results of the initiative showed that although there is not enough available land in Canada to completely offset the country's GHG emissions, afforestation can be useful mitigation technique for meeting GHG emission goals, especially until permanent, more advanced carbon storage technology becomes available.

On 14 December 2020, Canada's Minister of Natural Resources Seamus O'Regan announced the federal government's investment of $3.16 billion to plant two billion trees over the next 10 years. This plan aims to reduce greenhouse gas emissions by an estimated 12 megatonnes by 2050.

=== China ===
Beginning in 1900, China's governments mobilized labor and resources to plant trees. The People's Republic of China was the first to make significant progress in afforestation. In 1956, China began its Greening the Motherland afforestation campaign.

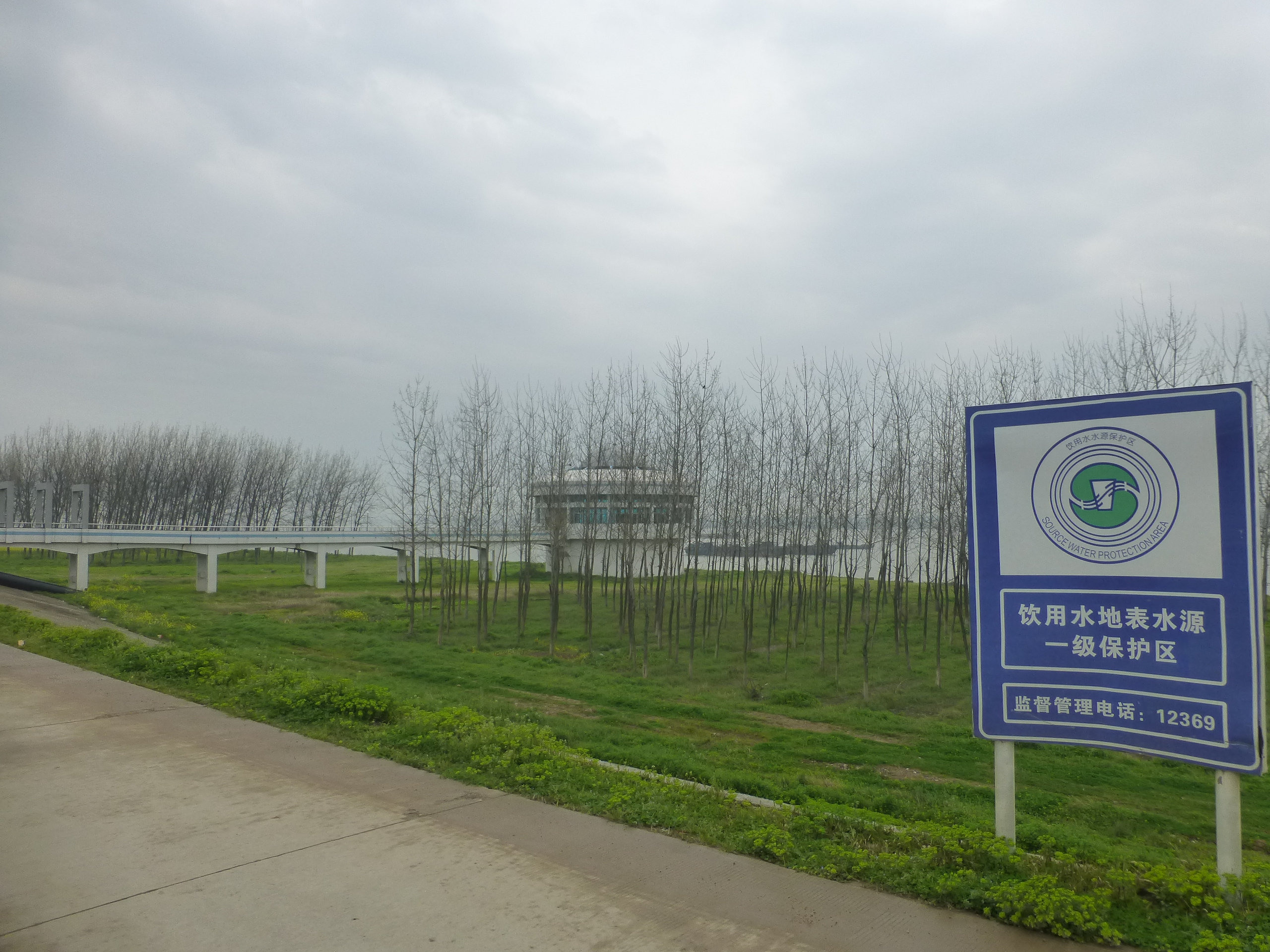
Strips of forest are planted along hundreds of kilometers of the Yangtze levees in Hubei province

Doubling of forest coverage between 1980 and 2021

China had the highest afforestation rate of any country or region in the world, with 4.77 million hectares (47,000 square kilometers) of afforestation in 2008. According to the 2021 government work report, forest coverage will reach 24 percent based on the main targets and tasks for the 14th Five-Year Plan period.

Tree-planting laws and school-children

A law in China from 1981 requires that every school student over the age of 11 plants at least one tree per year.

Other

From 2011 to 2016, the city Dongying in Shandong province forested over 13,800 hectares of saline soil through the Shandong Ecological Afforestation Project, which was launched with support from the World Bank. In 2017, the Saihanba Afforestation Community won the UN Champions of the Earth Award in the Inspiration and Action category for "transforming degraded land into a lush paradise".

The successful afforestation of the Loess Plateau involved collaborative efforts by international and domestic professionals alongside villagers. Through this initiative, millions of villagers across four of China's poorest provinces were able to improve farming practices and increase incomes and employment, alleviating poverty. In addition, the careful selection of trees ensured a healthy, self-sustainable ecosystem between tree and soil which facilitated a net carbon sink. The Loess Plateau, although successful, was costly, reaching almost US$500 million.

This contrasts with more recent initiatives where the results have not been as favorable. In an attempt to make afforestation both low-cost and less time-consuming, China shifted towards monoculture of mostly red pine trees. However, this did not adequately take into consideration environmental structure and led to increased soil erosion, desertification, sand/dust storms and short-lived trees. This has reduced China's environmental sustainability index (ESI) to one of the lowest in the world.

Regarding the effects of afforestation on long-term carbon stocks and carbon sequestration these decrease when trees are less than 5 years old and increase quickly thereafter. This means trees from monoculture planting that do not survive never reach full potential for carbon sequestration to offset China's carbon output. Overall, there is a possibility for afforestation to balance carbon levels and aid carbon neutrality, but several challenges still remain which hinder an all encompassing effort.

The Chinese government requires mining companies to restore the environment around exhausted mines by refilling excavated pits and planting crops or trees. Many mining companies use these recovered mines for ecotourism business.

=== European Union ===
Europe deforested more than half of its forested areas over the last 6000 years. The European Union (EU) has paid farmers for afforestation since 1990, offering grants to turn farmland into forest and payments for the management of forest. As part of the Green Deal, the EU program "3 Billion Tree Planting Pledge by 2030" provides direction on afforestation of previous farmland in addition to reforestation.

According to Food and Agriculture Organization statistics, Spain had the third fastest afforestation rate in Europe in the 1990–2005 period, after Iceland and Ireland. In those years, a total of 44,360 square kilometers were afforested, and the total forest cover rose from 13.5 to 17.9 million hectares. In 1990, forests covered 26.6% of the Spanish territory. As of 2007, that figure had risen to 36.6%. Spain today has the fifth largest forest area in the European Union.

=== India ===
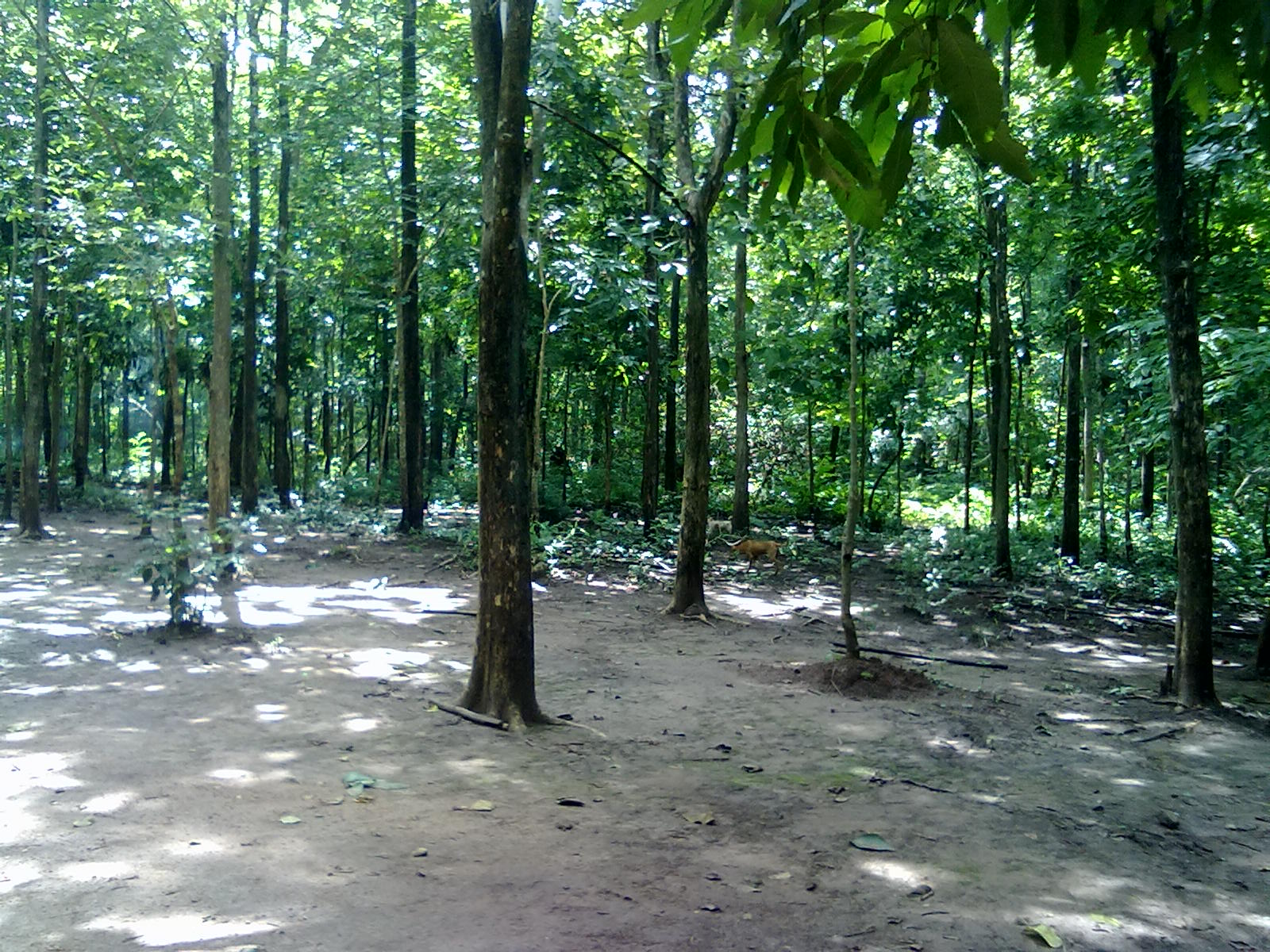
Afforestation in South India

As of 2023 the total forest and tree cover in India was 22%. The forests of India are grouped into 5 major categories and 16 types based on biophysical criteria. 38% of the forest is categorized as subtropical dry deciduous and 30% as tropical moist deciduous and other smaller groups.

In 2016 the Indian government passed the CAMPA (Compensatory Afforestation Fund Management and Planning Authority) law, allowing about 40 thousand crores rupees (almost $6 Billion) to go to Indian states for planting trees. The funds were to be used for treatment of catchment areas, assisted natural generation, forest management, wildlife protection and management, relocation of villages from protected areas, management of human-wildlife conflicts, training and awareness generation, supply of wood saving devices and allied activities. Increasing the tree cover would also help in creating additional carbon sinks to meet the nation's Intended Nationally Determined Contribution (INDC) of 2.5 to 3 billion tonnes of carbon dioxide equivalent through additional forest and tree cover by 2030 - part of India's efforts to combat climate change.

In 2016 the Maharashtra government planted almost 20,000,000 saplings and pledged to plant another 30,000,000 the following year. In 2019, 220 million trees were planted in a single day in the Indian state of Uttar Pradesh.

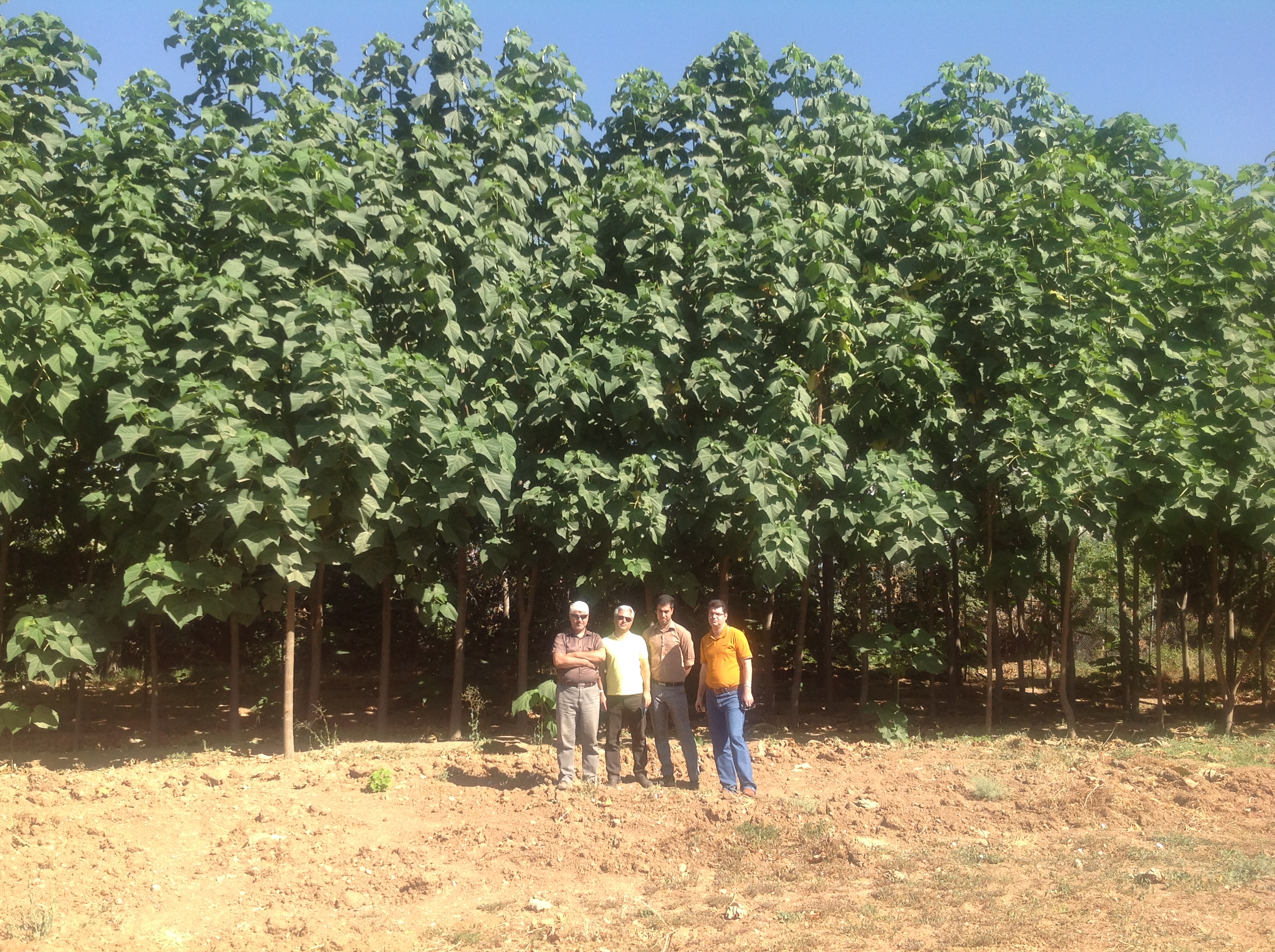
Fourth year of a genetically modified forest in Iran, planted by Aras GED through commercial afforestation

=== Israel ===
With wood production as a main objective, monocultures of Aleppo pine were vigorously planted between 1948 and the 1970s. Following a massive collapse of this species in the 1990s, due to attacks by the insect pine blast scale, the Aleppo pine was gradually replaced by Pinus brutia. Since the 1990s there has been a trend towards more ecological approaches planting mixed forests combining pines with broadleaf Mediterranean species e.g. oak, pistachio, carob, olive, arbutus and buckthorn. About 250 million trees have been planted through the JNF across Israel since 1990. Tree coverage increased from 2% in 1948 to over 8% at present.

=== Japan ===
The Japanese temperate rainforest is well sustained and maintains a high biodiversity. One method that has been utilized in maintaining the health of forests in Japan has been afforestation. The Japanese government and private businesses have set up multiple projects to plant native tree species in open areas scattered throughout the country. This practice has resulted in shifts in forest structure and a healthy temperate rainforest that maintains a high biodiversity.

=== United Kingdom ===
In January 2013, the UK government set a target of 12% woodland cover in England by 2060, up from the then 10%. In Wales the National Assembly for Wales has set a target of 19% woodland cover, up from 15%. Government-backed initiatives such as the Woodland Carbon Code are intended to support this objective by encouraging corporations and landowners to create new woodland to offset their carbon emissions.

==== Scotland ====
Charitable groups such as Trees for Life (Scotland) contribute to afforestation and reforestation efforts in the UK.

Afforestation efforts in Scotland have provided an increase in woodland expansion. By the 20th century mark, Scotland had diminished woodland coverage to 5% of Scotland's land area. However, by the early 21st century, afforestation efforts have increased woodland coverage to 17%. The Scottish government released their Draft Climate Change Plan in January 2017. The 2017 draft plan has increased the targeted woodland coverage to 21% by 2032 and increases the afforestation rate to 15,000 hectares per year.

=== United States ===
In the 1800s people moving westward in the US encountered the Great Plains – land with fertile soil, a growing population and a demand for timber but with few trees to supply it. So tree planting was encouraged along homesteads. Arbor Day was founded in 1872 by Julius Sterling Morton in Nebraska City. By the 1930s the Dust Bowl environmental disaster signified a reason for adding significant new tree cover. Public works programs under the New Deal saw the planting of 18,000 miles of windbreaks stretching from North Dakota to Texas to fight soil erosion (see Great Plains Shelterbelt).

== See also ==
- Buffer strip – Land management technique
- Forestry – Science and craft of managing woodlands
- Silviculture – Practice of controlling forests for timber production
- Windbreak – Rows of trees or shrubs planted to provide shelter from the wind
- Woody plant encroachment – Vegetation cover change
