= Afforestation in Scotland =

Scotland's environment

Afforestation efforts in Scotland have provided an increase in woodland expansion. By the 20th century mark, Scotland had diminished woodland coverage to 5% of Scotland's land area. However, by the early 21st century, afforestation efforts have increased woodland coverage to 17%. The Scottish government released their Draft Climate Change Plan in January 2017. The 2017 draft plan has increased the targeted woodland coverage to 21% by 2032 and increases the afforestation rate to 15,000 hectares per year.

== Modern history 1980–present ==
By the 1980s the Forestry Commission retained the services of three foresters with qualification in landscape design. This was in line with the inclusion of the social and recreational aspects of Scotland's new view on woodlands expansion. However, design, conservation and recreation all fell behind the commercial aspect of afforestation. In 1981 the Thatcher government amended the 1967 Forestry Act that included a shift in favor of privatization of woodland expansion. Grants for afforestation were simplified as incentive to private landowners and would work in conjunction with the tax deductions in place since the 1950s. Tax breaks lured investors looking for long-term investments. This eventually led to expansion into areas less conditioned for forest. This included the Flow Country, which was drained and used for commercial timber, mostly Sitka Spruce. This resulted in 90% of Scotland's afforestation being carried out through tax break and grant.

In 1982 the Forestry Commission and the Institute of Chartered Foresters organized a conference on broadleaves in Britain. This marked a turning point for afforestation. After the conference the British government reviewed all aspects of broadleaves policy. On 24 July 1985 the government presented a new broadleaved woodland policy. Even with the new policy in place that sought to protect and further afforestation of native woodlands, the northern highlands and Flow Country were still seeing commercial afforestation of non-native species.

In 1987 the Nature Conservancy Council published Birds, Bogs and Forestry. The publication took aim at the use of the Flow Country for commercial plantations. It argued that the use of the land was having a big impact on wildlife. Other publications enforced the claim made by the NCC and it also came at a time of public allegations of the government catering to the wealthy. In 1988 the Chancellor of the Exchequer canceled all tax incentives. The late '80s and '90s saw an increased interest by the public in Scotland's forests and the Forest commission was on board. As a result, in 1992 the Forest Commission established the Native Pinewoods Initiative, whose goal was to increase the area of native pinewood to 6,000 hectares by the late '90s.

The rise of the Labour Party in 1997 gave a further boost to afforestation of native tree species. Environmental preservation was high on the list of importance as was the inclusion of community in afforestation of woodland. Devolution from the U.K. took place in 1999. The Forestry Commission was dissolved and reorganized as the Forestry Commission Scotland.

In 2000 Forestry Commission Scotland released the first Scottish Forestry Strategy. In 2006 it was revised to reflect the issue of climate change as an important factor in woodland expansion. Scotland's emission target was not met in 2017 due to adjustments made in the EU's Emissions Trading System. In 2018 Scotland met its tree planting goal and introduced 11,200 new hectares of afforestation. This helped solidify Scotland's position as the leader in new tree planting within with UK, with 84% of new UK tree planting taking place in Scotland.

In April 2019, Forestry Commission Scotland was dissolved and formed into two new Scottish government agencies, Forestry and Land Scotland and Scottish Forestry. Forestry and Land Scotland is responsible for the conservation, management and promotion of Scotland's forest. Scottish Forestry is responsible for forestry policy, support and regulation.

== Future ==
The Scottish Government's Draft Climate Change Plan was published in 2017 and has set goals for the future of Scottish afforestation. Targets range from the years 2020–2050. This includes a woodland creation target of 12,000 hectares per year by 2020/21, 14,000 hectares by 2022/23 and 15,000 hectares per year by 2024/25. Included in the draft is the 2050 goal of greater ecosystem services through forestation that contributes to natural flood protection, biodiversity improvement and the country's natural capital.
