= Tree planting bar =

Ergonomic hand tool used by foresters for planting seeds for trees

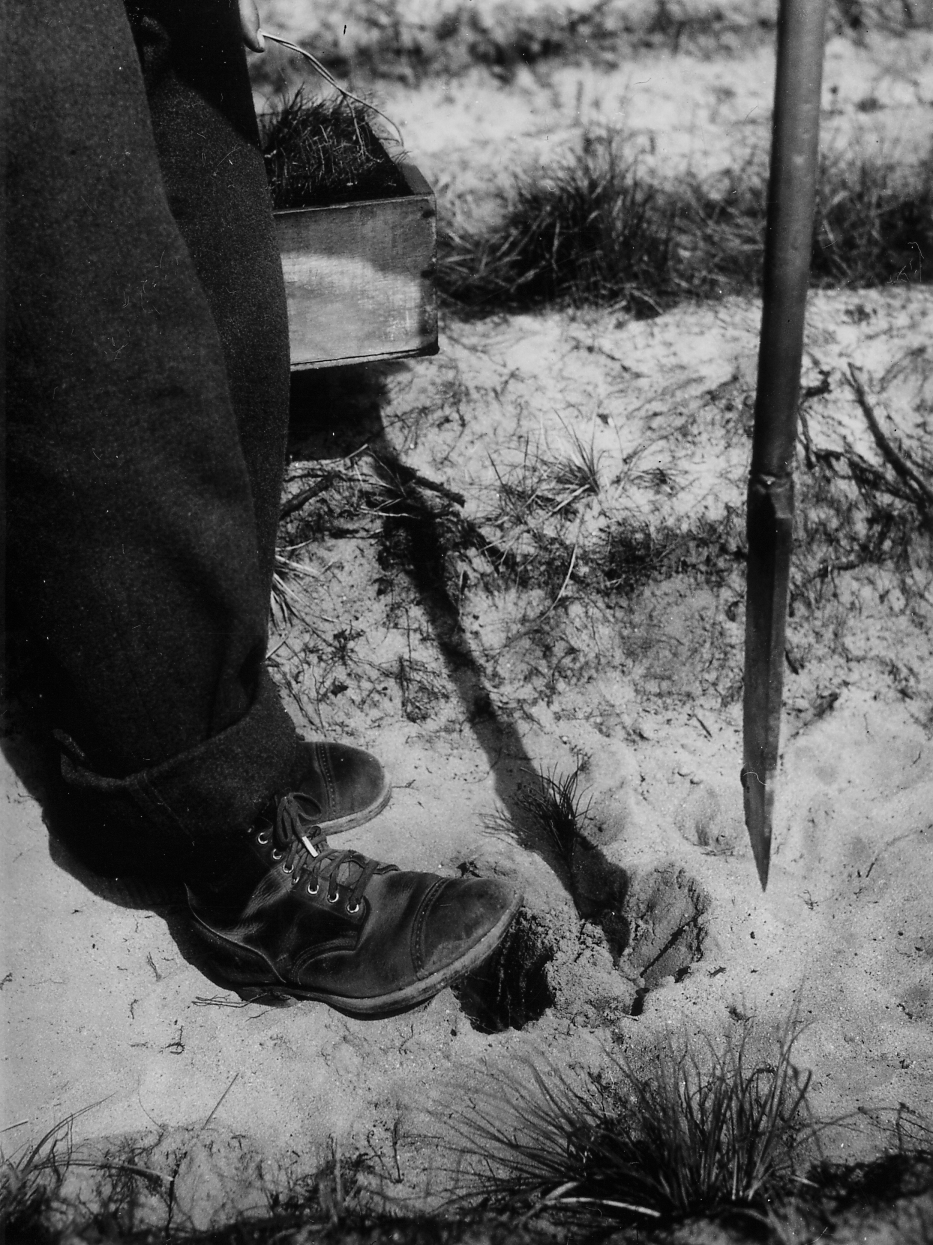
Photograph of Tree Planting with Michigan Planting Bar - NARA - 2129003

A tree planting bar or dibble bar is a tool used by foresters to plant trees, especially in large-scale afforestation or reforestation. It is very ergonomic, as it greatly speeds up the planting and prevents back pain.

Pointed planting bars are better for rockier soils.

== See also ==
- Pottiputki
- Hoe (tool)
- Dibber
