= Dibber =

Planting tool

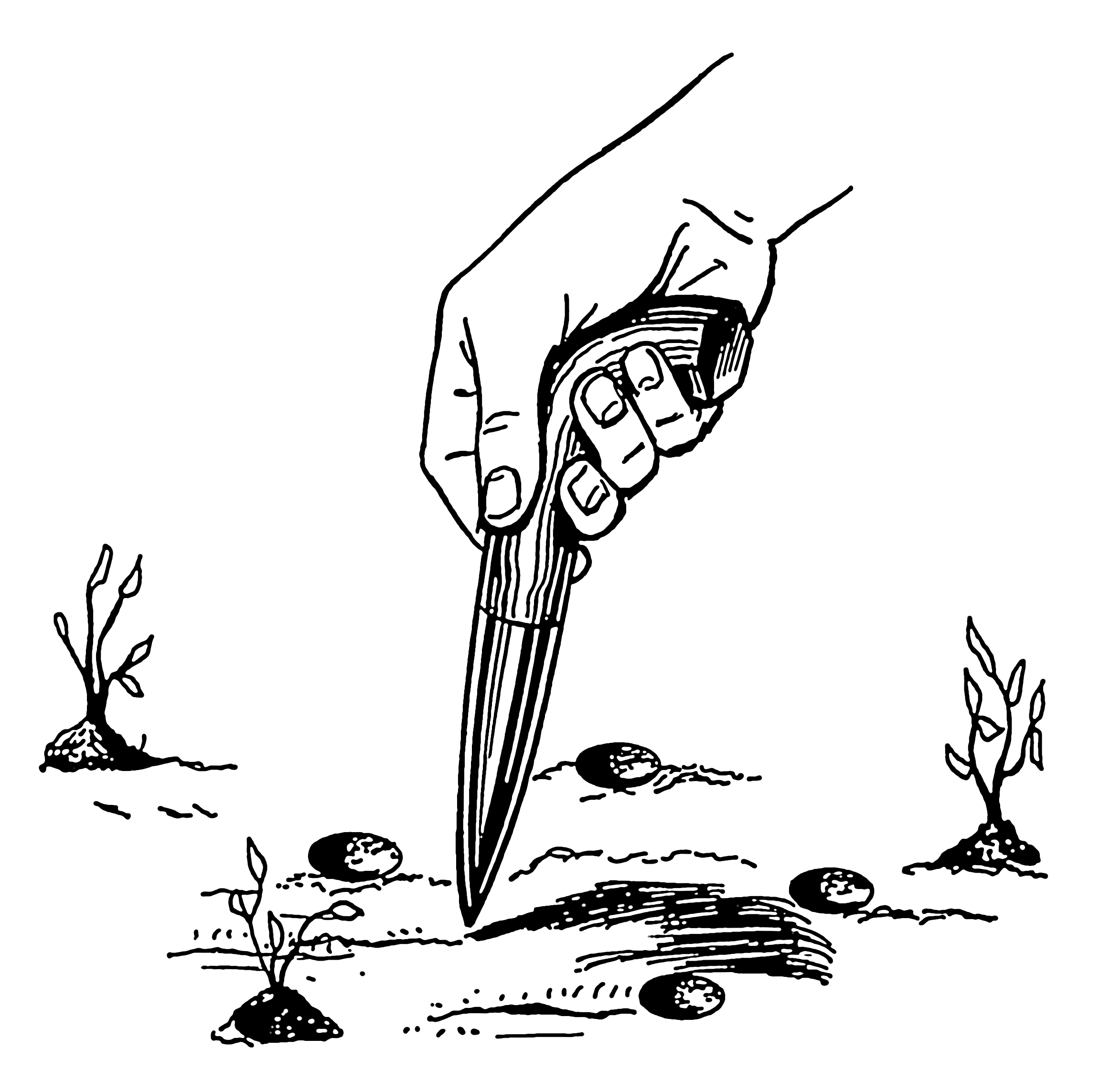
A straight dibber

A dibber or dibble or dibbler is a pointed wooden stick for making holes in the ground so that seeds, seedlings or small bulbs can be planted. Dibbers come in a variety of designs including the straight dibber, T-handled dibber, trowel dibber, and L-shaped dibber.

== History ==
The dibber was first recorded in Roman times and has remained mostly unchanged since. In the eighteenth and nineteenth centuries, farmers would use long-handled dibbers of metal or wood to plant crops. One person would walk with a dibber making holes, and a second person would plant seeds in each hole and fill it in. It was not until the Renaissance that dibbers became a manufactured item, some made of iron for penetrating harder soils and clay.

== Straight dibber ==
This is the classic dibber. It is anything from a sharpened stick to a more complicated model incorporating a curved handle and pointed steel end. It may be made of wood, steel or plastic.

== T-handled dibber ==
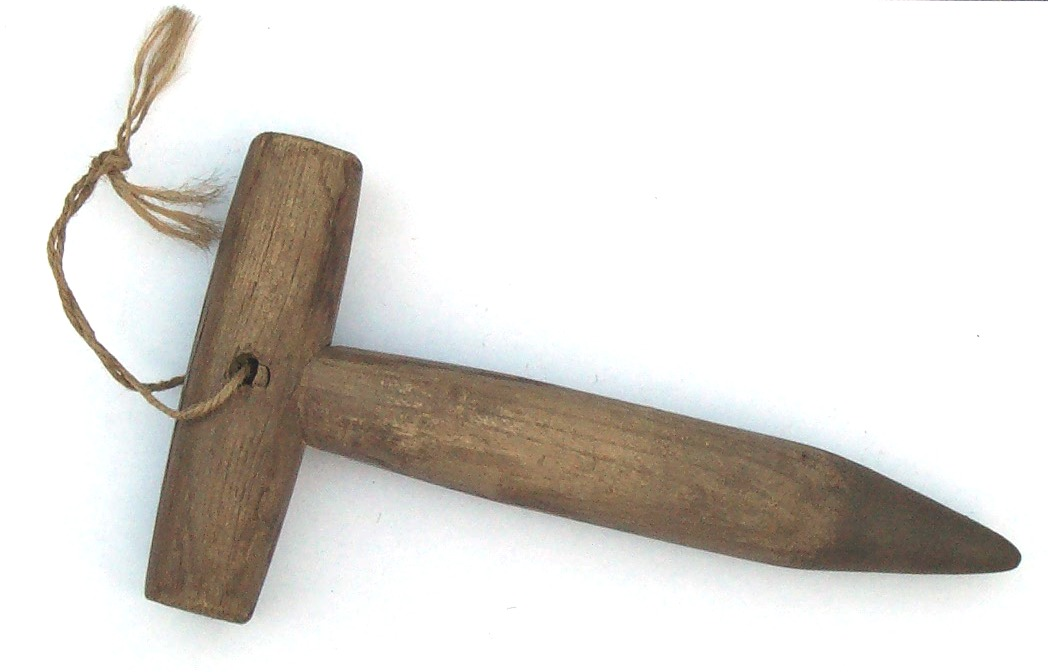
A T-handled dibber

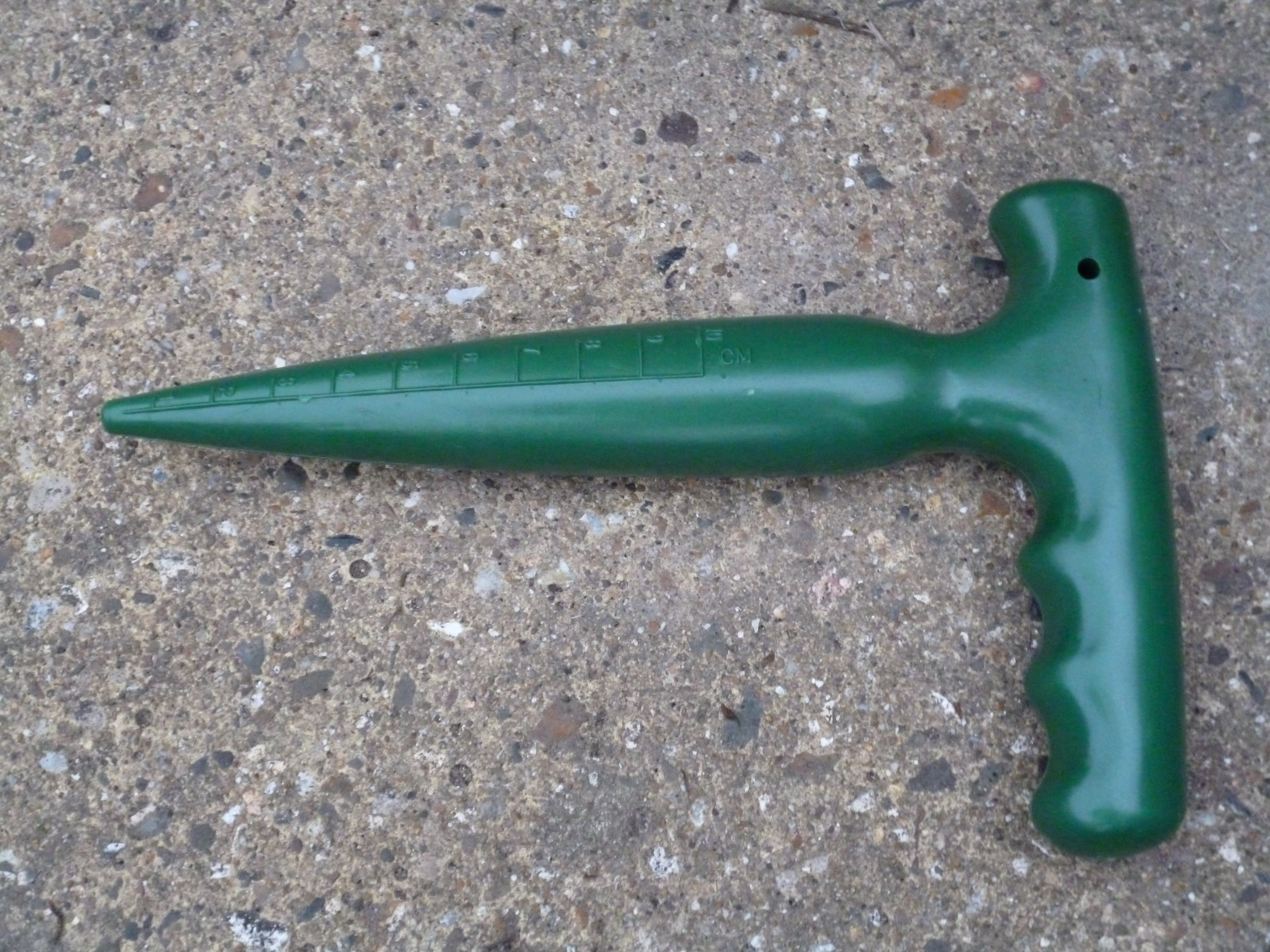
A plastic dibber with soil depth markings in centimetres

This dibber is much like the classic dibber, but with a T-grip that fits in the palm to make it easier to apply torque. This allows the user to exert even pressure, creating consistent hole depth.

== Trowel dibber ==
This dibber combines the features of a dibber and a trowel. It is usually forged from aluminum or other lightweight material. One end is for dibbing, and the other end is shaped like a trowel.

== In popular culture ==
British comedian Lee Mack donated a T-handled dibber to the British Lawnmower Museum, Southport, and spoke about it on the panel game show Would I Lie to You? (series six, episode three, first broadcast 27 April 2012).

In military parlance an aircraft-dropped 'dibber bomb' is an anti-runway penetration bomb which destroys runways by penetrating below the tarmac before exploding, cratering, and displacing the surface, making repairs difficult and time-consuming, during which conventional airplanes can neither land nor take off.

== See also ==
- Pottiputki (tool)

== Sources and external links ==
- William Bryant Logan, Smith & Hawken The Tool Book, 1997
- Antique Farm Tools
- Loudon, J.C. (1829), An Encyclopædia of Gardening: Comprising the Theory and Practice of Horticulture, Floriculture, Arboriculture, and Landscape-gardening, Including All the Latest Improvements; a General History of Gardening in All Countries; and a Statistical View of Its Present State, with Suggestions for Its Future Progress, in the British Isles, Longman, Rees, Orme, Brown, and Green, p. 270
