= Propagation of Christmas trees =

Agricultural practice

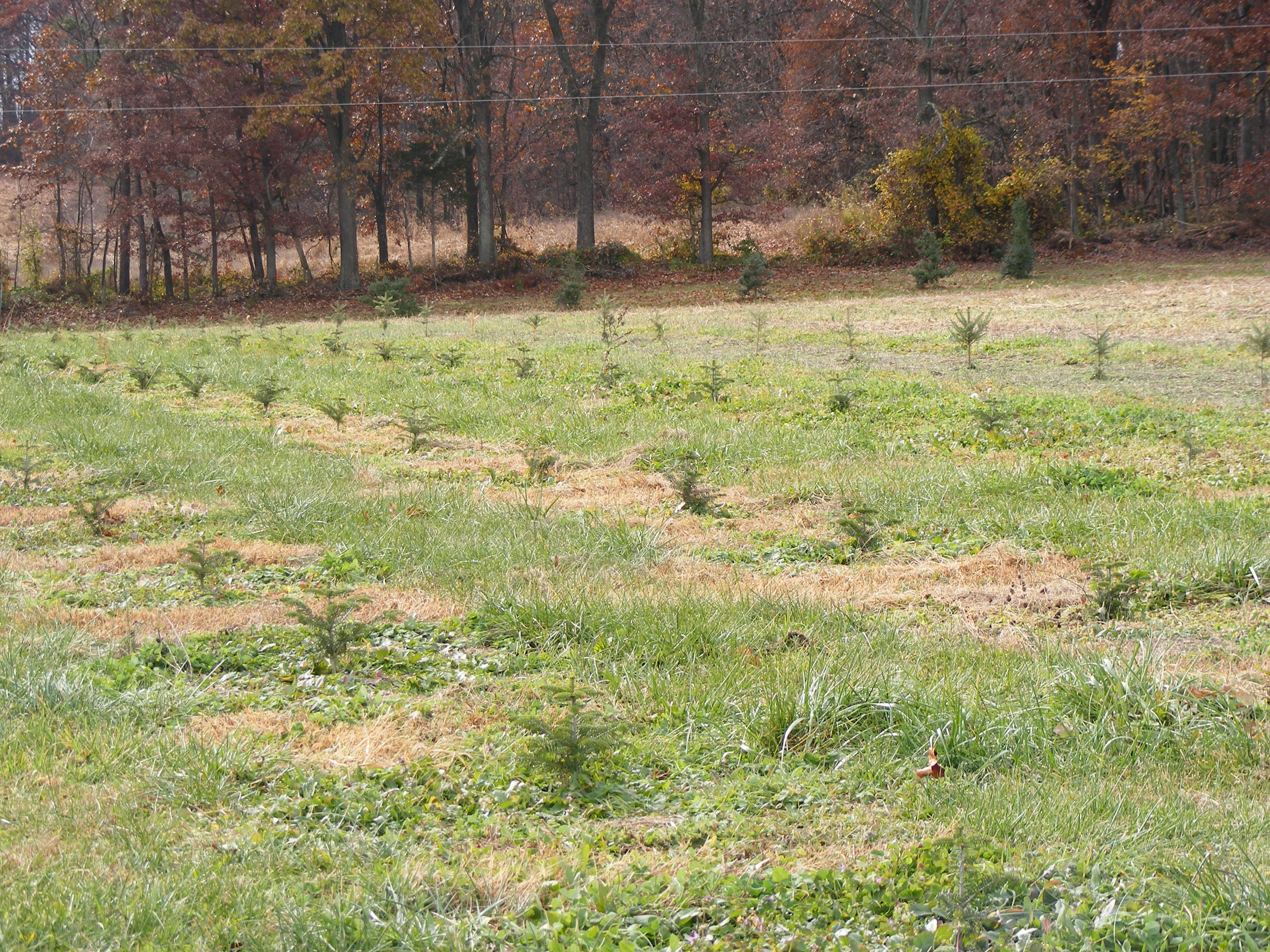
Canaan fir seedlings

Many different species of evergreen trees are used for Christmas trees. The most common of these species are classified in the four genera: pines, spruces, firs, and cypress. Christmas trees can be grown from seed or from root cuttings.

== Varieties of traditional Christmas trees ==
There are many different species of evergreen trees that are used for Christmas trees. The most common of these species are classified in one of four genera: pines (genus Pinus), spruces (genus Picea), firs (genus Abies), and cypress (genus Cupressa). In addition to these, the Douglas fir (Pseudotsuga Menziesii) is also commonly used as a Christmas tree, but it is not a true fir. The varieties of trees that a nursery chooses to propagate is dependent upon what type of farm is buying the reproduced plant, the climate of the nursery, the climate of the tree farm where the trees are to be grown, and the preferences of the retail customers.

The most commonly grown species include eastern white pine, Virginia pine, Scotch pine, Colorado blue spruce, Norway spruce, Serbian spruce, white spruce, balsam fir, grand fir, Frasier fir, Canaan fir, noble fir, Turkish fir, white fir, Blue Ice Carolina and Sapphire cypress (both are sterile hybrids of the Arizona cypress), Leyland cypress, eastern red cedar, and Douglas fir. These trees have become popular because of their appearance, color, aroma, texture, or a combination of these properties. The Norway spruce, Serbian spruce, Scotch pine, and Turkish fir are not native to the United States. However, genetic variations within these species have allowed some varieties to be grown in climates that differ substantially from the climate where the species originated. The eastern white pine is native to the eastern U.S. The Colorado blue spruce is native to Colorado and Utah. The white spruce is native to the north-central U.S. and Canada. The noble, Douglas, and grand firs are both native to the northwest of the U.S. The balsam fir is native to the northeastern U.S. The Canaan fir is native to the Canaan Valley of West Virginia. The white fir is native to California and the Southwestern mountains of the U.S. From these varied trees, Christmas tree nurseries must select varieties to propagate based on the climate of their region and the type of farms that they will be selling to.

=== Limitations due to type of farm ===
Fresh cut tree farms are generally large farms that grow trees that are cut in large numbers and sold to wholesalers who sell them to local stores and Christmas tree lots. The extended period of time that elapses from the time of cutting the tree until the retail customer takes the tree home limits the number of species of trees that can be used as fresh cut trees. These trees must be able to retain their color and their needles for long periods of time after they are cut. The most common species that are grown as fresh cut trees are Frasier fir, Scotch pine, Douglas fir, and balsam fir. Since fir trees generally require cooler climates, nurseries that primarily propagate trees for fresh cut tree farms are typically located in the northern United States.

Choose-and-cut tree farms are typically smaller than fresh cut tree farms because they sell in smaller quantities than fresh cut tree farms. They typically sell directly to the customer who chooses and then cuts his or her own tree. Since the trees are cut at the moment of purchase, the limitations of the farm are primarily due to the farm’s geographic location. Needle and color retention are much less of a concern because of the freshness of the trees. For this reason, Christmas tree nurseries that propagate trees for sale to choose-and-cut tree farms typically sell more species of trees and can be located closer to the Mason–Dixon line. Some nurseries that specialize in cypress trees are located as far south as Florida.

=== Limitations due to geography ===
The geographic location of the Christmas tree nursery dictates what species of trees can be propagated. White and Scotch pines are relatively adaptable species of trees. Because many genetically different varieties are available, they can be grown in most of the temperate areas of the United States. True firs generally prefer a much cooler climate and are primarily grown in the northern United States, with some varieties that only thrive in mountainous climates. Spruce prefer cool climates, but they will tolerate warmer conditions than most fir trees. Cypress generally prefer a warmer climate. For this reason, they are grown primarily in the southern and southwestern United States. The Douglas fir is a fairly adaptable species and can be grown in much of the United States. In addition to the nursery’s location, the type and location of farms that purchase the seedlings or rooted cuttings also plays an important role in the type of tree that is propagated.

Christmas tree propagation internationally has similar issues of geographical limitation, such as in Australia where the seasons for pruning and harvest differ from the northern hemisphere. Additionally, the environment of Australia favours the growth of Pinus radiata which is no longer commonly grown in the northern hemisphere.

== Seed choice and preparation ==
The selection of the correct seed for a specific environment and the proper preparation of the seeds prior to planting are necessary to ensure germination and survival of the seedling.

=== Selection of seed source ===
The selection of seed source by the tree nursery is critical. The specific variety that is selected must meet the needs of its customers and be capable of germinating and growing in the climate where the nursery is located. The variety must also be able to thrive in the region where the tree farm that is purchasing the seedlings is located. Genetic variations within the species of conifers that are used for Christmas trees have produced individual varieties of trees that can thrive in certain climates where other varieties of the same species cannot. This same genetic variation can also produce trees that are aesthetically more pleasing than others. Knowledge of the seed source allows the nursery to provide trees that are suitable for their customer specific locations and needs as well as satisfy the desires of the end-purchaser who will take the tree home for Christmas. Scientists are working on methods to reduce the costs of artificially producing seeds for white spruce, Norway spruce, and Douglas fir through somatic embryo production in a liquid medium. This method uses the living cells of one tree to produce man-made seeds that will produce a clone of the original plant. If the costs are reduced significantly, this could result in nearly perfect Christmas trees. However, this will create a monoculture crop which may be susceptible to a single pest or disease.

=== Seed stratification ===
Viable seeds produced by a mature tree undergo Stratification. This process imitates the period of dormancy that occurs during the winter. In the commercial Christmas Tree nurseries of the northern United States, seeds are sown directly into seed beds in the late fall to allow the seeds to stratify naturally over the winter. Stratification can also be achieved by refrigerating moist seeds from 30 to 90 days. The commercial method typically yields a higher percentage of germination than artificially reproduced stratification.

=== Seed scarification ===
After stratification, most seeds need some type of scarification. Scarification is the process that allows the hard shell of the seed to be penetrated by water. This is usually accomplished by soaking the seeds in water for a period of time. In some cases, the seed shell must be scraped with an abrasive to speed up the process. In nature, this process typically occurs through the seed’s immersion in water during the spring melt of snow and ice. It can also occur through the digestive process of an animal that eats the seed and then passes it in its excretion.

=== Conditions required for germination of seed ===
Unlike most garden seeds, conifer seeds require shade and cool conditions to germinate. This can be accomplished by placing a thick layer of mulch over the seeded tree bed and erecting a canopy over it to reduce direct sunlight. This simulates the conditions where the seeds would typically germinate naturally

== Rooting by cutting ==
Some species of Christmas trees can only be propagated by root cuttings because they do not produce viable seeds because they are sterile inter-generic hybrids. These cuttings are taken from an existing tree, thus the new trees are clones of the original tree. The Blue Ice cypress, the Leyland cypress, and the Carolina Sapphire cypress are all tree species that must be propagated in this manner.

=== Selection of cuttings ===
The selection of the cuttings that are taken is critical to ensure successful rooting and proper growth habits. The cuttings should be taken from upright shoots of trees that are less than 10 years old. Choosing upright shoots ensures apical dominance and upward growth and reduces the possibility of the tree growing laterally like a bush. The cuttings should be taken in late winter or early spring and be 8 to 12 inches long and have some brown coloration near the base of the cutting. The cuttings should be kept in water until they are ready to be placed in rooting media.

=== Preparation and rooting of cuttings ===
Once the cuttings have been acquired, the bases of the cuttings are dipped into rooting hormone and immediately placed in containers filled with porous rooting media to facilitate rooting. Once potted, the rooting media need to be kept moist and the cuttings need to be misted regularly. The cuttings should develop an adequate root system for transplantation in about three months. It has been determined that rooting hormones containing higher levels of IBA increase the percentage of cuttings that develop viable roots in Carolina Sapphire cypress. Studies have also shown that misting at 7- to 10-minute intervals increases the amount of successful root development in Leyland cypress cuttings.

== See also ==
- Propagation of grapevines
- Plant propagation
- Tree planting
