= British Lawnmower Museum =

Museum in Southport, England

Coordinates: 53.639381°N 3.004895°W

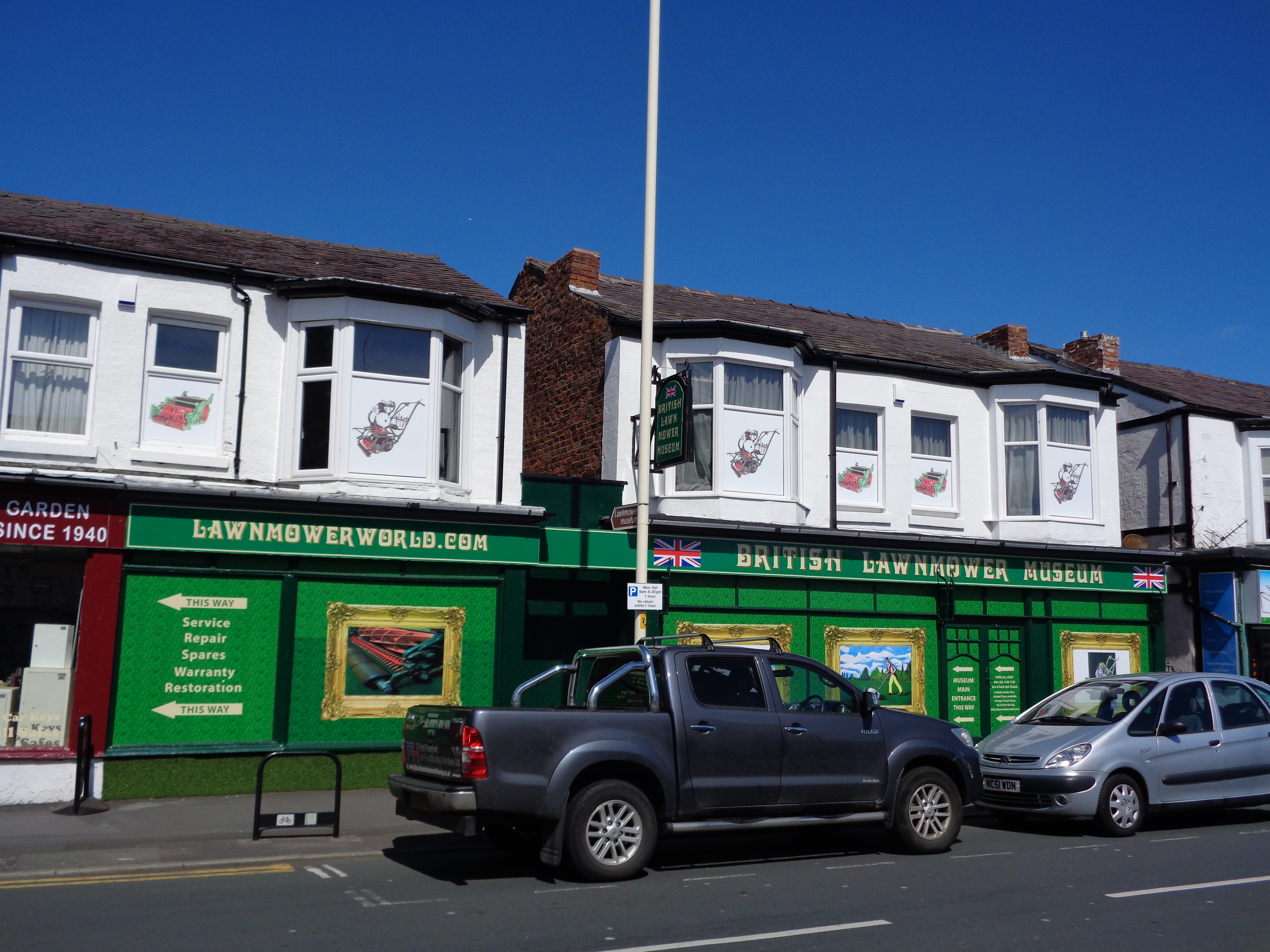
- Location: 106-114 Shakespeare Street, Southport PR8 5AJ
- Website: www.lawnmowerworld.co.uk

The British Lawnmower Museum is a museum dedicated to the history of the lawn mowers in Southport, Merseyside, northern England. The museum was opened in 1991 by Brian Radam, operating alongside his family business selling lawnmowers.

== Collection ==
The museum is owned by Brian Radam. He opened the museum in 1991, alongside his family business Lawnmowerworld which has been operating since 1945. The museum has over 300 restored exhibits of garden machinery from over the last 200 years, as well as a collection of lawnmowers previously owned by famous people including Prince Charles and Princess Diana, guitarist Brian May, performer and presenter Paul O'Grady, comedian Lee Mack, and Coronation Street actress Jean Alexander, who lived in Southport for many years.

The museum has workshops that restore lawnmowers for the collection and others around the world. The collection includes patents and blueprints dating from 1799. In addition, the museum owns a number of modern lawnmowers, including a solar powered mowing robot.

== In the media ==
The museum was mentioned in an episode of Would I Lie to You? in 2012. Southport–born comedian Lee Mack claimed that he had donated a dibber to the museum, which can still be seen on display. Mack revealed that this was true. In the same segment, Richard Bacon mentioned that he had also donated a trowel to the museum.

The museum also hires out vintage lawnmowers for use as film and TV props.
