= One billion trees planting program =

Iranian government project to plant trees from 2021-2025

- طرح ملی کاشت یک میلیارد درخت
- Type of project: Afforestation
- Ministry: Minister of Road and Urban Development, Minister of Energy, Minister of Agriculture Jihad, Minister of Industries, Mines, Trade
- Funding: Iran oil industry provides part of 18000 billion toman
- Website: https://1btree.frw.ir/

The One Billion Tree Planting Project is an Iranian government project to plant trees from 2021-2025.

In 2021, the government directed the Minister of Agriculture Jihad, the Natural Resources and Watershed Management Organization, and the Department of Environment to conduct the program.

Iran's water crisis fed doubts about the project's viability.

== Goals ==
Three hundred million trees were to be planted by the government. 250 million saplings were to be produced annually. Project goals include to revitalize natural jungles, to farm trees, to increase urban green space, and to counter sandstorms.

== Cultivar ==
The Northern provinces were to receive crataegus and oak trees . In the west Carpinus betulus (European hornbeams). Central provinces would receive robinia, fraxinus, and persian lilacs. Finally, the Southern provinces would plant eucalyptus and mangrove trees.
