= Persian lilac =

The name Persian lilac is commonly used for two different woody plants.

- Syringa × persica, a shrub in the olive family (Oleaceae)
- Melia azedarach, a tree in the mahogany family (Meliaceae)
