= Forestry Commission Scotland =

Forestry Commission Scotland was the division of the UK Forestry Commission responsible for forestry in Scotland until 2019, when it was dissolved.

- Forestry Commission was the body responsible for forestry in Scotland prior to 2019, and continues to be responsible for forestry in England
- Forestry and Land Scotland is the body now responsible for the management of Scotland's national forest estate
- Scottish Forestry for the body now responsible for policy and regulation of the forestry sector in Scotland
