= Pottiputki =

Hand tool that allows ergonomic seed planting while walking

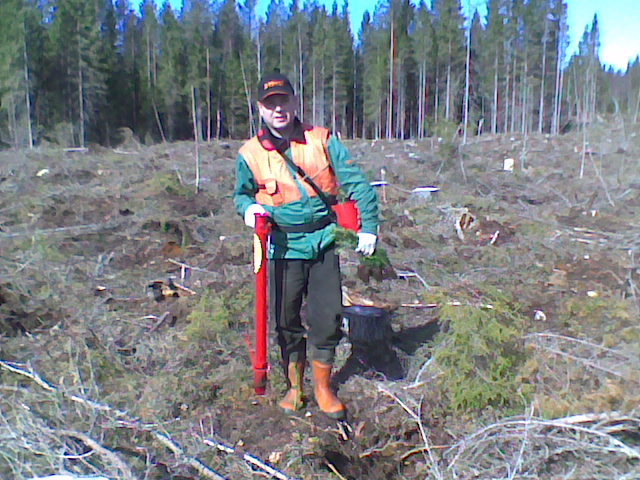
Pottiputki and worker

Pottiputki is a planting tool that was created by Tapio Saarenketo in the early 1970s, used for manual planting of containerized seedlings. The planters can work in an ergonomically correct position while maintaining high productivity, making the task both fast and comfortable. It is more effective, but more expensive than the traditional mattock.

The tool is a tube (of ca. 90cm long); a pedal opens a pointed beak (also described as a type of scissors) at the base, which creates the planting hole; at the same time a seedling (for instance in a paper pot) is dropped down the tube, and after the seedling is free from the tube, the beak can be closed again with a thumb controlled latch that releases a spring, so the apparatus is ready for another seedling. The entire operation is so easy that an "experienced tree planter can operate almost at walking pace and plant several thousand trees in a day".

== See also ==
- Hoedad
- Tree planting
- Tree planting bar
- Reforestation
