= Mattock =

Hand tool for chopping, digging, and prying

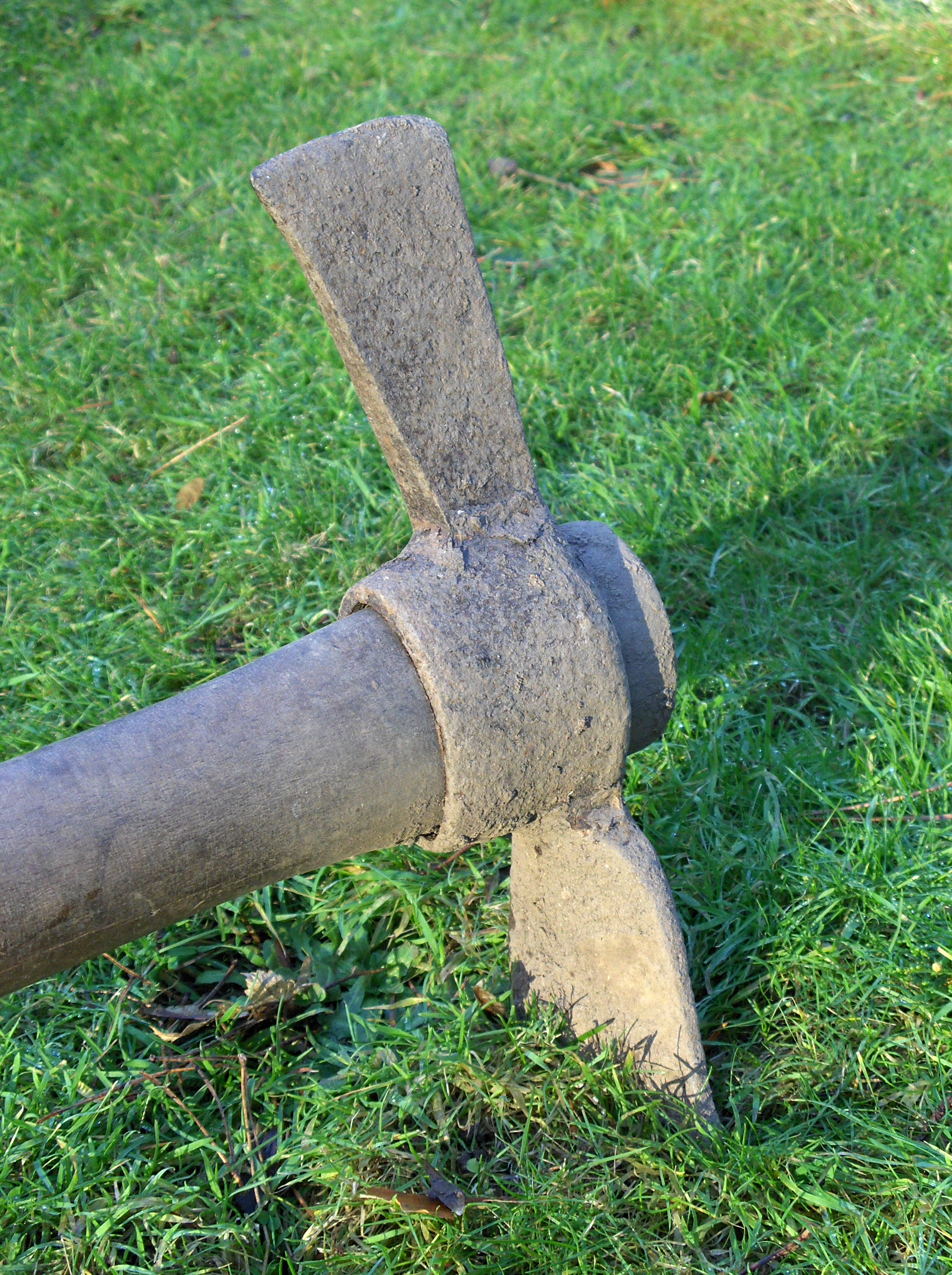
- A "cutter mattock" combines both axe and adze blades.
- Classification: Digging tool
- Related: Pickaxe

A mattock (/ˈmætək/) is a hand tool used for digging, prying, and chopping. Similar to the pickaxe, it has a long handle and a stout head which combines either a vertical axe blade with a horizontal adze (cutter mattock), or a pick and an adze (pick mattock). A cutter mattock is similar to a Pulaski used in fighting fires. It is also commonly known in North America as a "grub axe"; in New Zealand it is often simply called an "adze".

== Description ==
A mattock has a shaft, typically made of wood, which is 3–4 ft (0.9–1.2 m) long. The head consists of two ends, opposite each other and separated by a central eye. A mattock head typically weighs 3–7 lb (1.4–3.2 kg). The form of the head determines the kind and uses of the mattock:

- A cutter mattock combines the functions of an axe and adze, with its axe blade oriented vertically and longer adze horizontally.
- A pick mattock combines the function of a pick and adze, with a pointed end opposite an adze blade.

Both are used for grubbing in hard soils and rocky terrain, with the pick mattock having the advantage of a superior penetrating tool over the cutter mattock, which excels at cutting roots.

== Uses ==
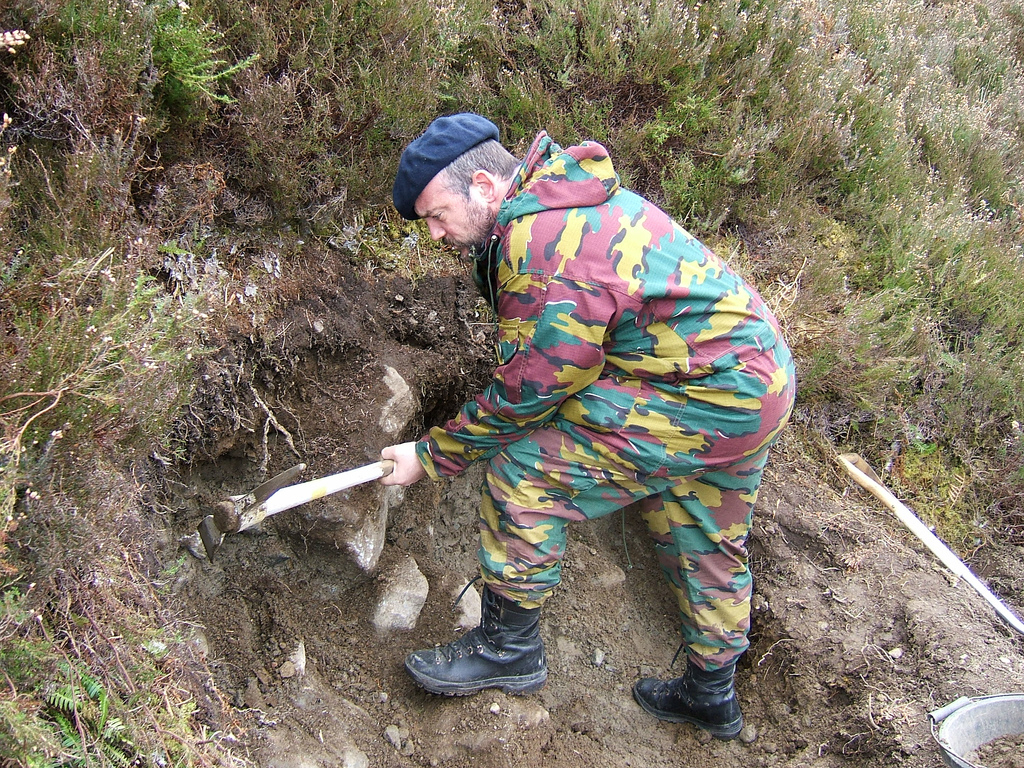
Using the adze to excavate

Mattocks are "the most versatile of hand-planting tools". They can be used to chop into the ground with the adze and pull the soil towards the user, opening a slit to plant into. They can also be used to dig holes for planting into, and are particularly useful where there is a thick layer of matted sod. The use of a mattock can be tiring because of the effort needed to drive the blade into the ground, and the amount of bending and stooping involved.

The adze of a mattock is useful for digging or hoeing, especially in hard soil.

Cutter mattocks (Swahili: jembe-shoka) are used in rural Africa for removing stumps from fields, including unwanted banana suckers.

== History ==
Symbol of a mattock found on the Phaistos Disc

As a simple but effective tool, mattocks have a long history. Their shape was already established by the Bronze Age in Asia Minor and ancient Greece. According to Sumerian mythology, the mattock was invented by the god Enlil. Mattocks (Greek: μάκελλα) are the most commonly depicted tool in Byzantine manuscripts of Hesiod's Works and Days.

Mattocks made from antlers first appear in the British Isles in the Late Mesolithic. They were probably used chiefly for digging, and may have been related to the rise of agriculture. Mattocks made of whalebone were used for tasks including flensing – stripping blubber from the carcass of a whale – by the broch people of Scotland and by the Inuit.

== Etymology ==
The word mattock is of unclear origin; one theory traces it from Proto-Germanic, from Proto-Indo-European. There are no clear cognates in other Germanic languages, and similar words in various Celtic languages are borrowings from the English (e.g. Welsh: matog, Irish: matóg, Scottish Gaelic: màdog). However, there are proposed cognates in Old High German and Middle High German, and more speculatively with words in Balto-Slavic languages, including Old Church Slavonic motyga and Lithuanian matikas, and even Sanskrit. It may be cognate to or derived from the unattested Vulgar Latin matteūca, meaning club or cudgel. The New English Dictionary of 1906 interpreted mattock as a diminutive, but there is no root to derive it from, and no semantic reason for the diminutive formation. Forms such as mathooke, motthook and mathook were produced by folk etymology. Although used to prepare whale blubber, which the Inuit call "mattaq", no such connection is known.

While the noun mattock is attested from Old English onwards, the transitive verb "to mattock" or "to mattock up" first appeared in the mid-17th century.

== See also ==
- Dolabra
- Ice axe
- Pickaxe
- Pottiputki
