= Bamboo cultivation =

Cultivation and raw material industry

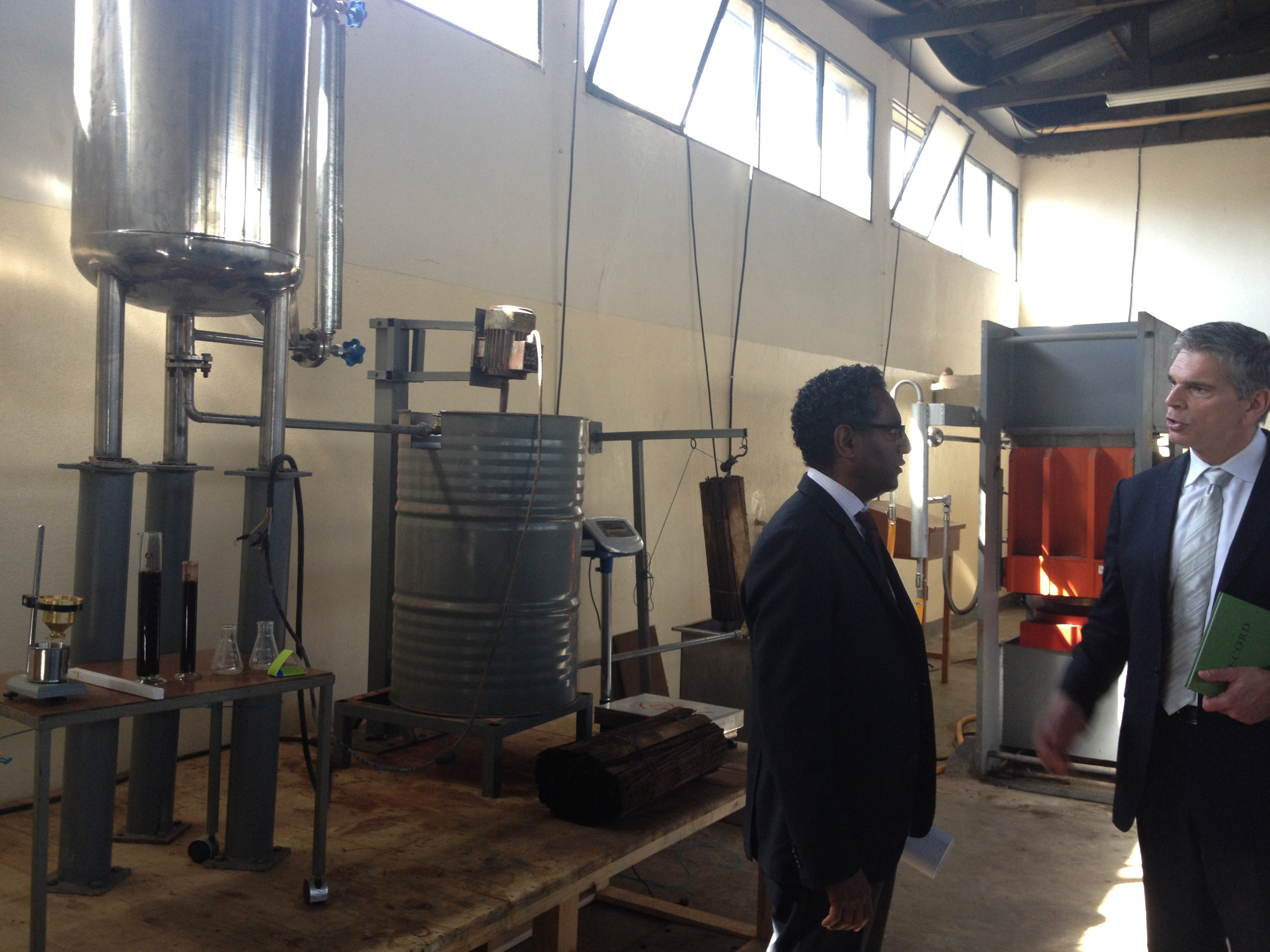
African Bamboo Product Innovation Lab where bamboo farming techniques and industrial uses are tested inside the company's facility in Addis Ababa, Ethiopia

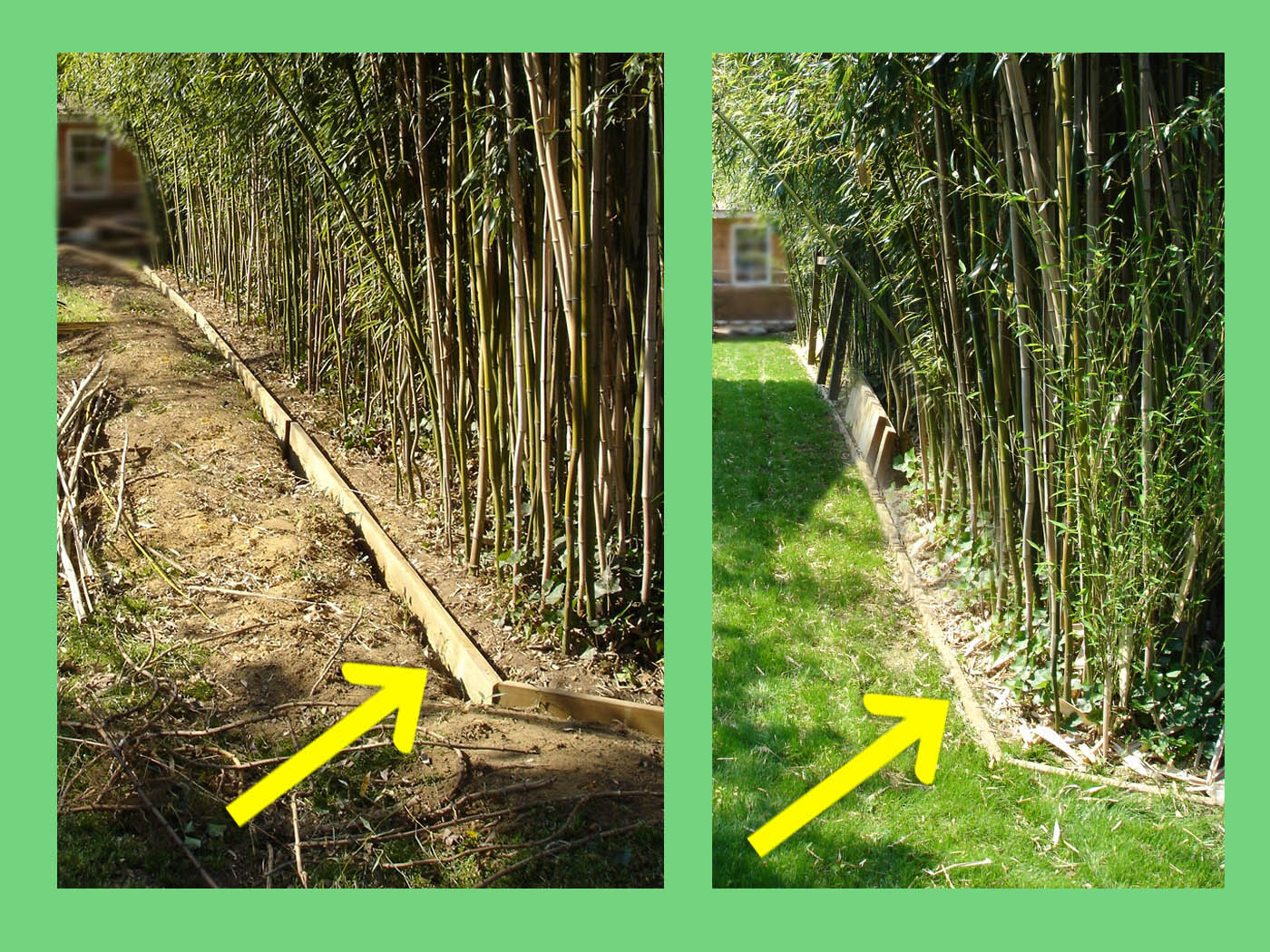
Bamboo contained by an in-ground barrier, shown during and after construction

Bamboo forestry (also known as bamboo farming, cultivation, agriculture or agroforestry) is a cultivation and raw material industry that provides the raw materials for the broader bamboo industry, worth over 72 billion dollars globally in 2019.

Historically a dominant raw material in South and South East Asia, the global bamboo industry has significantly grown in recent decades in part because of the high sustainability of bamboo as compared to other biomass cultivation strategies, such as traditional timber forestry. For example, as of 2016, the U.S. Fiber corporation Resource Fiber is contracting farmers in the United States for bamboo cultivation. Or in 2009, United Nations Industrial Development Organization published guidelines for cultivation of bamboo in semi-arid climates in Ethiopia and Kenya.

Because bamboo can grow on otherwise marginal land, bamboo can be profitably cultivated in many degraded lands. Moreover, because of the rapid growth, bamboo is an effective climate change mitigation and carbon sequestration crop, absorbing between 100 and 400 tonnes of carbon per hectare (40–160 tonnes per acre). In 1997, an international intergovernmental organization was established to promote the development of bamboo cultivation, the International Bamboo and Rattan Organisation.

Bamboo is harvested from both cultivated and wild stands, and some of the larger bamboos, particularly species in the genus Phyllostachys, are known as "timber bamboos". Bamboo is typically harvested as a source material for construction, food, crafts and other manufactured goods.

Bamboo cultivation in South, South East Asia and East Asia stretches back thousands of years. One practice, in South Korea, has been designated as a Globally Important Agricultural Heritage Systems.
