= OneTree =

OneTree was a project started in 1998 in England to tell the full story of a single tree and the extraordinary value it brought to society, its beauty and the versatility of its wood. The project has inspired a number of projects around the world.

The project was initiated by Garry Olson and Peter Toaig, who worked with 70 artists and makers. The project ran for some three years until 2001 but a website about the project is still live.

== Other 'onetree' projects ==
The original OneTree project has inspired a number of projects around the world:

- Fifty artists were involved in a project of the same name in Tasmania that 'saved' a tree (of unknown species) from being chipped and increased its estimated value from $350 to $10,000.
- Another one tree project in Alaska following the life of one birch tree is currently underway.
- The most recent onetree project to be initiated is the OneOak project running in the UK, where a 160-year-old oak tree is being felled on the Blenheim Estate in Oxfordshire.
