= Multipurpose tree =

Trees grown and managed for more than one output

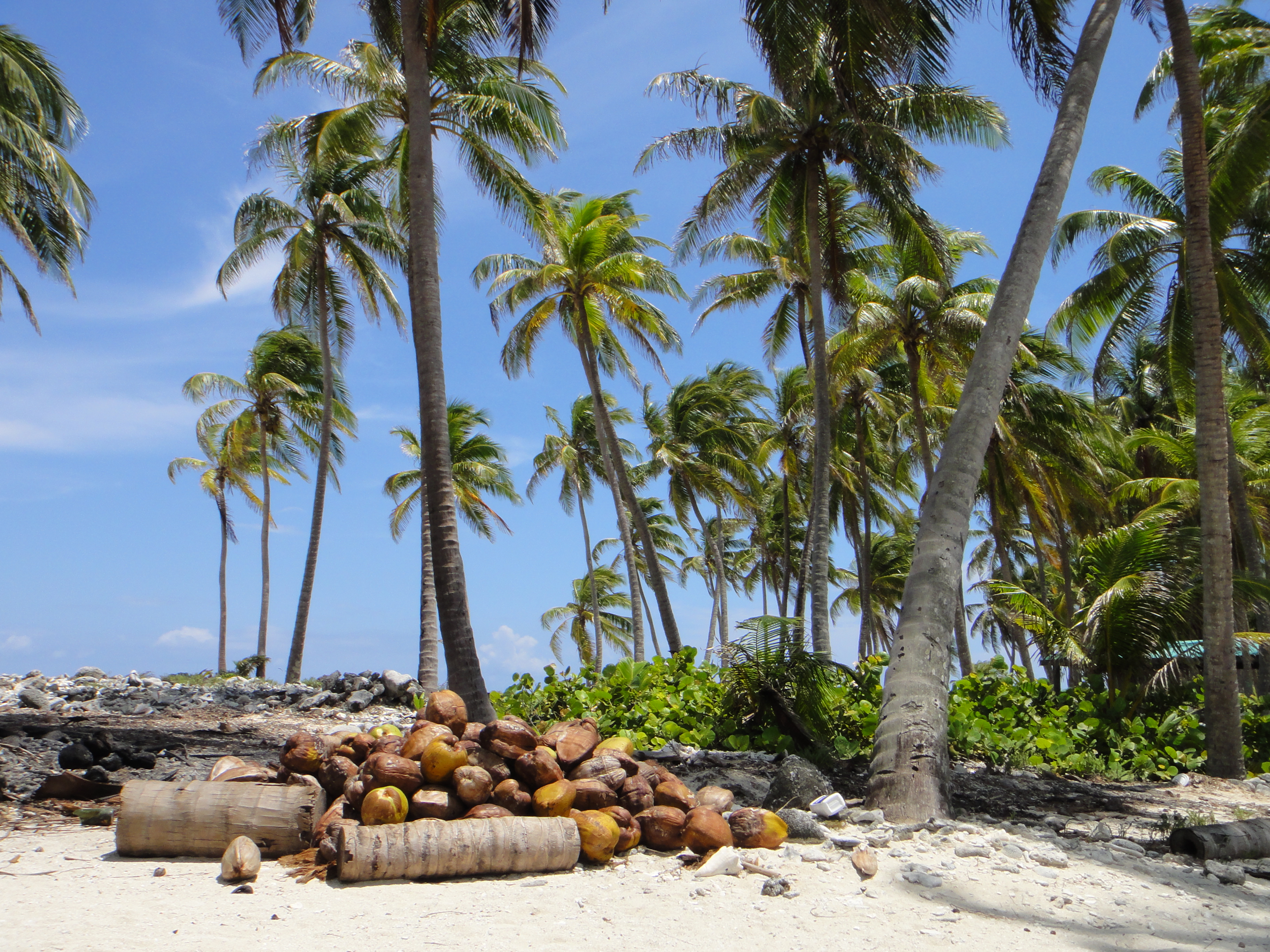
Coconut palm, a common multipurpose tree

Multipurpose trees or multifunctional trees are trees that are deliberately grown and managed for more than one output. They may supply food in the form of fruit, nuts, or leaves that can be used as vegetable; while at the same time supplying firewood, adding nitrogen to the soil, or supplying some other combination of multiple outputs. "Multipurpose tree" is a term common to agroforestry, particularly when speaking of tropical agroforestry where the tree owner is a subsistence farmer.

Perennial woody trees and shrubs play a role beyond their primary functions, extending to their acceptance and impact on local farmers and communities.

While all trees can be said to serve several purposes, such as providing habitat, shade, or soil improvement; multipurpose trees have a greater impact on a farmer's well-being because they fulfill more than one basic human need. In most cases multipurpose trees have a primary role; such as being part of a living fence, or a windbreak, or used in an alley cropping system. In addition to this they will have one or more secondary roles, most often supplying a family with food or firewood, or both.

When a multipurpose tree is planted, a number of needs and functions can be fulfilled at once. They may be used as a windbreak, while also supplying a staple food for the owner. They may be used as fencepost in a living fence, while also being the main source of firewood for the owner. They may be intercropped into existing fields, to supply nitrogen to the soil, and at the same time serve as a source of both food and firewood.

== Common multipurpose trees of the tropics ==
- Gliricidia (Gliricidia sepium) – the most common tree used for living fences in Central America, firewood, fodder, fixing nitrogen into the soil.
- Moringa (Moringa oleifera) – edible leaves, pods and beans, commonly used for animal forage and shade (it does not fix nitrogen as is commonly believed)
- Coconut palm (Cocos nucifera) – used for food, purified water (juice from inside the coconut), roof thatching, firewood, shade.
- Neem (Azadirachta indica) – limited use as insect repellent, antibiotic, adding nitrogen to the soil, windbreaks, biomass production for use as mulch, firewood.
- Acacia nilotica holds significant value for rural communities due to its varied uses.

Ideally most trees found on tropical farms should be multipurpose, and provide more to the farmer than simply shade and firewood. In most cases they should be nitrogen fixing legumes, or trees that greatly increase the farmer's food security.

== See also ==
- OneTree
