= Tree credits =

Reward for climate-friendly agroforestry

Tree credits is concept of community-based agroforestry whereby a tree planter or caretaker's climate services are rewarded. The system has been developed in response to the need for a simple way to get carbon credits to the individual planter with a minimum of overheads, and to simplify implementation and monitoring of such projects by using for-profit methods, much like microfinance.

Tree credit systems have been incorporated into stormwater management programs for development sites at local, state and national levels. Calculation methods vary, but all programs encourage the preservation of existing trees as well as planting of new trees at these sites as a method to reduce stormwater runoff. Many of these systems assess the benefit of individual trees, but additional interest is growing for ways to assess the benefits of cumulative tree cover over entire sites. These credit systems aim to quantify the services provided by trees to treat stormwater and preserve water quality, air quality, and carbon sequestration. The credits allow site designers to subtract area from total site area or impervious area when calculating water quality volume (WQv) and/or recharge volume (REv). Credits are not calculated consistently across these systems due to the fact that tree benefits can vary with size, species, climate, site etc. Two common types of credit are impervious surface reduction and volume reduction.

== Impervious Surface Reduction Credit ==
Impervious surface reduction is the most common credit where sites are credited with an impervious surface area reduction per tree. These credits are determined by type of tree (evergreen, deciduous) with greater credit for evergreen trees and whether it is an existing or new tree (100-200 ft^2 for new trees or ½ of canopy area of existing trees). For a given site there is usually a maximum total tree credit awarded of 25% of the total impervious surface. To ensure there is a runoff reduction, there is often an eligibility requirement for trees within a specific distance of existing impervious surfaces (10-25 ft) to get credit. Other eligibility criteria might include tree species, size or design. These types of credits have been implemented over various municipalities across the U.S. (OR, CA, IN, WA, PA, TX) within the last 20 years.

== Volume Reduction Credit ==
Another credit system involves trees credited for a runoff volume reduction based on retention value individual trees. In some areas, greater volume reduction credit is awarded for preserved trees over planted trees (20 ft^3 for preserved trees, 10 ft^3 for planted trees) while in other areas credits can instead be determined based on size with trees (10 gal/inch for trees under 12” DBH, 20 gal/inch for trees over 12” DBH) (for example, Washington DC, GA, VT). Additional factors that can affect the amount of credit awarded are soil volume and tree canopy to assess stormwater benefits.

== History ==
Tree credits have been calculated as stormwater credits, and using a tree carbon calculator.

A tree credits system using cryptocurrency was developed by Ferdinand Swart.

Several community tree plantings were designed or influenced by tree credits methods (OARM, PSA, GPS). The Indian state of Karnataka introduced plans for tree credits in 2016.

== See also ==
- Market-based environmental policy instruments
