= Deforestation in Central America =

Loss of forest biome in the Americas

Central American countries have experienced cycles of deforestation and reforestation since the decline of Maya civilization, influenced by many factors such as population growth, agriculture, narcotic distribution and illegal practices. From 2001 to 2010, 5,376 square kilometres (2,076 sq mi) of forest were lost in the region. In 2010 Belize had 63% of remaining forest cover, Costa Rica 46%, Panama 45%, Honduras 41%, Guatemala 37%, Nicaragua 29%, and El Salvador 21%. Most of the loss occurred in the moist forest biome, with 12,201 square kilometers. Woody vegetation loss was partially set off by a plus in the coniferous forest biome with 4,730 km^{2}, and at 2,054 km^{2}. Mangroves and deserts contributed only 1% to the loss in forest vegetation. The bulk of the deforestation was located at the Caribbean slopes of Nicaragua with a minus of 8,574 square kilometers of forest lost in the period from 2001 to 2010. The most significant regrowth of 3,050 km^{2} of forest was seen in the coniferous woody vegetation of Honduras.

== History ==
Deforestation in Central America is one of the environmental problems that is linked to the settlement of agrarian frontier areas by land-seeking farmers and commercial agrarians, who facilitated the conversion of forest land to pasture, more expansion of cash crop like coffee, banana, logging activities, pasture and fuelwoods among other urbanization activities. The central American region experienced the highest rate of deforestation in the world between the 1960s to 1970s. The so-called "hamburger connection" has been the leading cause of deforestation in the region, with more settlers concentrating on clearing the land for cattle ranching and commercialization activities. Moreover, various research statistics provide that approximately 949,150 acres of forest, in which equals to 384,107.377 ha of forest, were lost each year between 1990 and 2010 in the United States. According to Food and Agriculture Organization (FAO), central America lost an average of 285,000 ha of forest annually between 2000 and 2005. One of the most troubling observations made by the research team in the report is that in the past 15 years, the three largest remaining forest blocks in Central America have been decreased in size by more than 23 percent.

=== Fifteenth century ===
By the fifteenth century, intensive Mayan agriculture had significantly thinned the forests, but had not completely decimated them. Before Europeans arrived, forests covered 500,000 square kilometers – approximately 90% of the region. The arrival of the Spaniards caused a sharp decrease in population resulting from the highly contagious diseases introduced by the conquistadores. This reduction in human pressure gave much of the land that had been cleared for cultivation time to recover. Eventually, the forcing of "Europe's money economy on Latin America" created the demand for the exportation of primary products, which introduced the need for large amounts of cleared agricultural land to produce those products. While the cultivation of some exports such as indigo and cochineal dye worked harmoniously with the surrounding indigenous vegetation, other crops such as sugar required clear-cutting of land and mass quantities of firewood to fuel the refining process, which spurred rapid, destructive deforestation.

=== Eighteenth century to twentieth century ===
From the eighteenth to the twentieth century, mahogany exports for furniture became the major cause of forest exhaustion. The region experienced economic change in the nineteenth century through a "fuller integration in the world capitalist system". This, combined with conflict with Spain, put an even greater emphasis on plantation cropping. Throughout the nineteenth and twentieth centuries, Europe and North America have become the chief importers of the region's coffee and banana crops, thus putting increasing demand on the land to produce large quantities of these cash crops and perpetuating the clearing of more forest in an attempt to acquire more exploitable farmland.

=== Most recent ===
Most recently, as of the 1960s, cattle ranching has become the primary reason for land clearing. The lean grass-fed cattle produced by Central American ranches (as opposed to grain-fed cattle raised elsewhere in America) was perfectly suited for North American fast-food restaurants and this seemingly bottomless market has created the so-called "hamburger connection" which links "consumer lifestyles in North America with deforestation in Central America". This demonstrates how the developed world has had an indirect influence on the environment and landscape of developing countries.

In Central America, the deforestation rate also threatens the survival of iconic species such as jaguars, tapirs, and scarlet macaws. The white-lipped peccary, an important keystone species for Central American forests, is so endangered that it could soon become extinct in the area. White-lipped peccaries migrate in large herds in search of fruit and other food in large forest tracts, acting both as an indicator of forest health and connectivity and as a key prey species for jaguars.

== Logging ==
Logging is another factor that increases deforestation in multiple ways. Entry to the forest fringes by roads increases resource misuse, such as illegal logging and bush meat hunting. Though regulated logging is far less detrimental to the forest, uncontrolled logging is prevalent in developing countries due to the demand for timber to house growing populations, and the poor economic situation of those making their living from and in the forest itself. Furthermore, all forms of logging necessitate the building of roads, which generates easy access to those seeking new land to clear for agriculture. The use of wood as the primary fuel for cooking and heating is compounded by developing countries inability to pay high oil prices. As a result, the demand for firewood is "one of the most commonly cited causes of deforestation".

In Guatemala, because of agriculture and timber industries, 98 percent of the original rainforest was destroyed in this region. Huge areas of forest are, in most situations, lost only to destroy a few highly valued trees. There are permanent effects of the impact of this devastation: heavy machinery compacts soil and renders it more vulnerable to erosion.

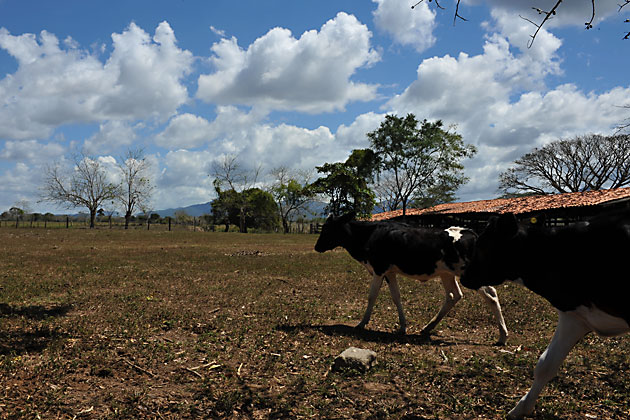
Aftermath of deforestation processes due to cattle ranching purposes in the region of Honduras.

== Narco-deforestation ==
The pervasion of the illegal drug trade throughout the region decimates forestland and is primarily fueled by demand for narcotics in North America. Honduras, Guatemala, and Nicaragua have suffered from some of the highest rates of deforestation in the world since 2000 and in 2005 these rates of forest loss began to accelerate, coinciding with an influx of drug trafficking activity. Following the election of Felipe Calderón in 2006 and the ignition of the Mexican drug war, many Mexican drug trafficking organizations (DTO) relocated their operations southward enticed by the porous borders, corruption, and weak public institutions characteristic of Guatemala and Honduras. The sparsely populated forested highlands in these countries harbor little state presence and offer perfect refuge for DTO's looking to evade interdiction.

=== Avocado trade in Mexico ===
Mexico's multi-billion dollar avocado industry has become a prime target for DTOs, which seize farms and clear protected woodlands to plant avocado groves. Cartel members have been known to show up unannounced, armed with automatic weapons and chainsaws. When locals protest that the area is protected from logging, they are held at gunpoint and ordered to keep quiet. The deforestation is not always obvious — loggers covertly trim back only the forest canopy, planting avocado trees in a hidden layer beneath. This practice increases greenhouse gas emissions as forests are thinned to make way for more orchards.

=== Illegal cattle ranching ===
One of the principal causes of deforestation has been determined to be large-scale illegal cattle ranching, much of it taking place within protected areas and indigenous territories. Often, this criminal activity is related to drug trafficking and money laundering. Corruption makes poor forest inhabitants less likely to formally engage in conservation, whether forced or voluntary. One interviewee clarified common knowledge among forest communities: the grossest environmental violations are committed by wealthy, politically-connected, narco-enriched elites.

The increased trafficking of cocaine through Guatemala and Honduras is correlated with a rise in the region's rate of forest loss. In the forests of eastern Honduras, the amount of newly detected deforestation is greater than 5.29 hectares while in Guatemala's Petén, extensive amounts of forest loss was matched by an unprecedented number of cocaine flows through the area. According to Dr. Kendra McSweeney from Ohio State University, the baseline rate of deforestation in the region of about 20 km^{2} per year has accelerated to 60 km^{2} per year under the narco-effect – a deforestation rate of around 10%. In 2011, the Río Plátano Biosphere Reserve in Honduras was designated as a "World Heritage in Danger" by UNESCO due to the striking degree of deforestation at the hands of narco-traffickers.

=== Mechanisms linked with narcotics and forest loss ===
Three interrelated mechanisms explain the trend of forest loss following the establishment of a drug transit hub. The first is the clearing of forestland for the construction of clandestine roads and airstrips used by vehicles transporting narcotics, pesticides, and fertilizers. Second, the influx of vast amounts of cash and weapons into areas that are already weakly governed only intensifies the preexisting pressures on forests there. The introduction of narco-capital into these frontiers encourages landowners and other actors in the region to participate in the drug trade, which often leaves indigenous communities bereft of their land and livelihoods. Finally, the large profits to drug traffickers incentivize DTOs to convert forest to agriculture to launder these profits. "Improving" remote land not only allows narco-traffickers to inconspicuously convert their assets into private earnings but also legitimizes the DTO's presence in the area. Though conversion of land within protected forest area and indigenous communities is illegal, traffickers have the political influence necessary to guarantee impunity. As for the indigenous communities marginalized by increased drug trafficking activity, they are powerless in the face of the narcos' violence and corruption; conservation groups in the region are threatened and state prosecutors are bribed to turn a blind eye to illegal "narco-zones." According to Dr. Kendra McSweeney from Ohio State University, the baseline rate of deforestation in the region of about 20 km^{2} per year has accelerated to 60 km^{2}. McSweeney cites Honduras' world's highest homicide rate, explaining that conservationists are essentially too scared to express their opinions and vocalize for the cause, as they could have potential consequences and threats to silence them. International environmental groups have pointed to the death of Jairo Mora Sandoval as an example of this sort of silencing of conservationists by narco-traffickers, indicating that the ecological and social effects of the drug trade have been felt throughout Central America.

== Population growth ==
As the countries of this region continue to develop, the sheer number of people, as well as trade with developed countries, puts pressure on natural resources by creating many of the situations previously discussed, such as the necessary clearing of land for agriculture and housing. Another study shows that population growth and technological development in Central America (the Mesoamerican biodiversity hotspot) does in fact have a direct impact on the rate of deforestation.

Other regions in central America experienced increased population growth, such as Petén, owing to the discovery of oil and by the deportation procedure of political refugees from the Guatemalan Civil War. The increased rates of urbanization and population increase resulted in increased rates of deforestation. According to recent statistics, the population of Central America doubles within a range of 15 years, from 2.1 million in 2000 to 4.2 million in 2015.

== Global impact ==
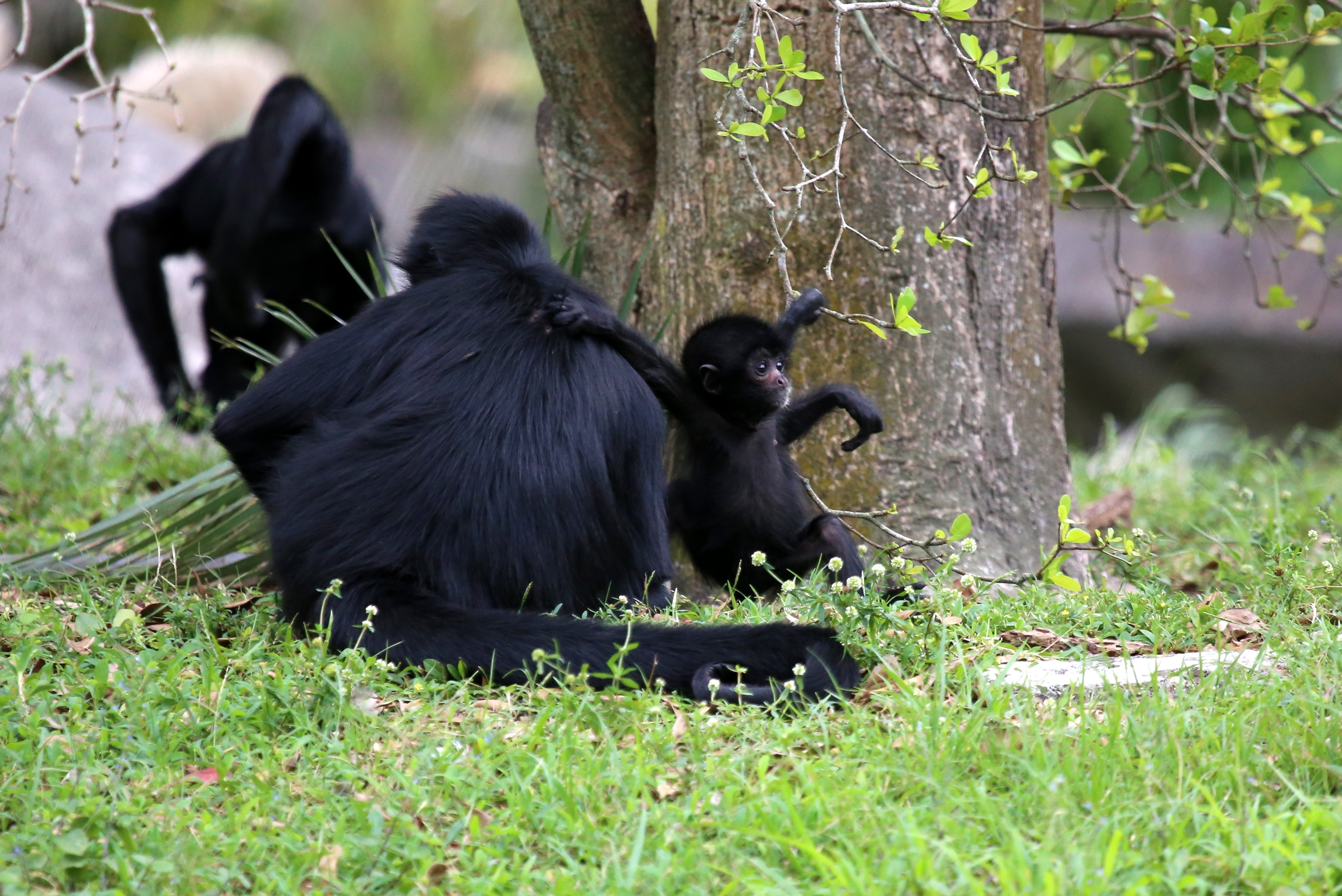
Endangered Spider Monkey's due to deforestation processes

Losing Central America's forests does not just threaten the region; it has global implications. Forests help absorb and store carbon dioxide that heats the planet. But whenever they are destroyed, they increase the rate of carbon emissions to the environment hence heating the planet for the interest of a few land-settler, business people, and drug traffickers. Subsequently, the following carbon emissions that are a result of the deforestation processes are reportedly linked and associated with hindering the atmosphere and can play a factor in then warming the planet. In which, this correlates to playing a role in the increase of carbon emissions in the atmosphere, a reported amount of 10-20% accounted from deforestation processes. Moreover, drug traffickers in the region increase the rate of migration or relocation for the locals when they are developing the routes in the regions. This increases the rates of poverty and political instabilities in the region. On the other side, the development of these drug traffickers in the region increases the availability and use of drugs in the community hence potentially destroying youths, families, and productivity in the community. The eradication of the habitat for rare species like the jaguar, tapirs, and scarlet macaws may reduce the tourist rate, which is a local and global issue. Furthermore, it has been reported that through tropical deforestation like that of in the Central America's, there have been 140 species extinct. Potential loss or loss of species, contribute to the food chain in which could play into adverse affects to the surrounding environments and can then possibly be linked to other external environments indirectly.

Similarly to the Amazonian rainforest, the Central American forest also "adds to local humidity through transpiration". Without the extra moisture from transpiration, rainfall totals are significantly decreased. Moreover, with less moisture in the air comes the increased susceptibility to fire. These local ramifications are quite serious and affect the quality of life of the surrounding populations, especially the poor, rural peoples who depend on the land for their livelihoods. In addition to the strain on the local environment, the destruction of the rainforests has "a broader impact, affecting global climate and biodiversity".

== Scientific background linked to deforestation ==
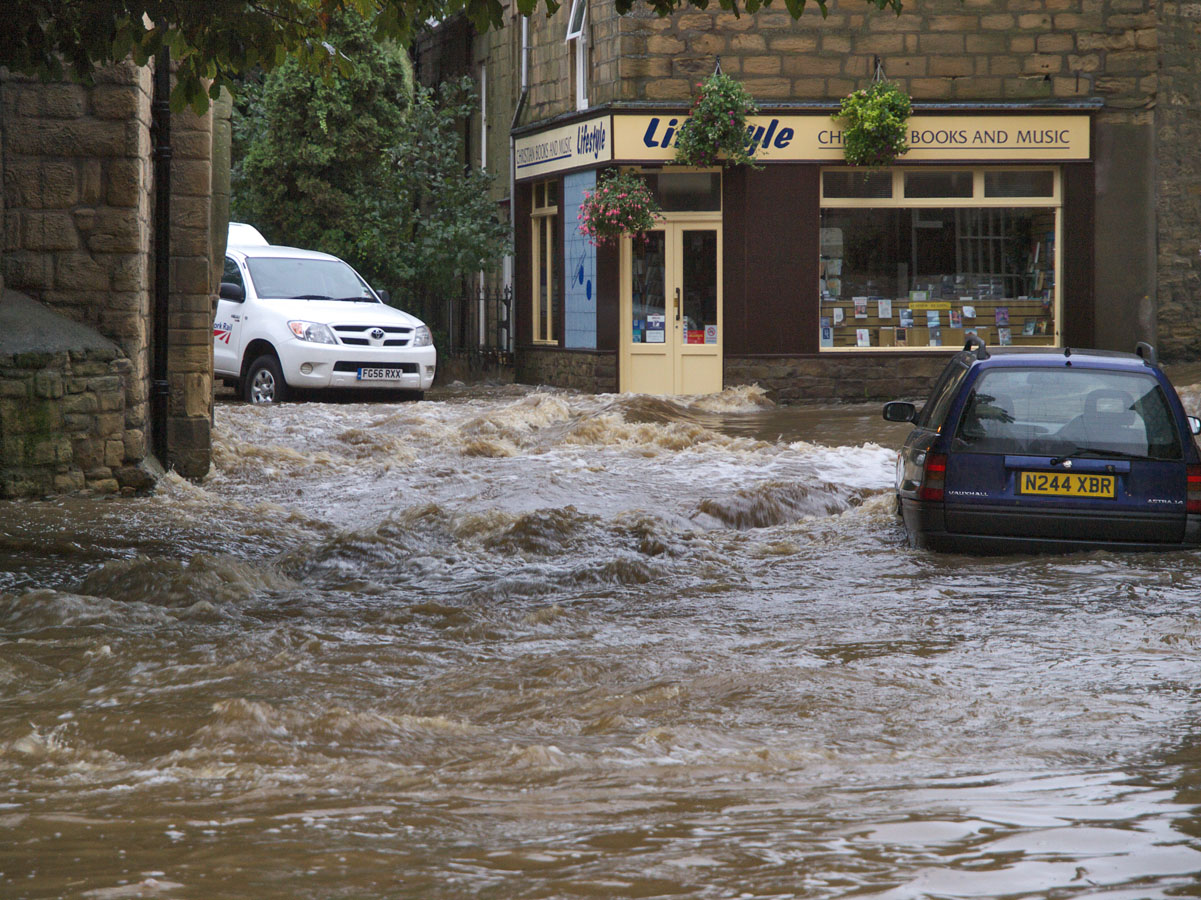
An example of flooding occurring in result from anthropogenic actions like that of deforestation.

In part of the deforestation processes of the Central America region, the following practices are associated with scientific aspects. As previously stated, the trees present are taking in the carbon dioxide and help to store this substance away from the atmosphere. In which essentially, serves a role to assist in making the atmosphere a healthier environment. However, in the process of deforestation, the trees are being removed and thus, contribute to less trees available to remove the substance and can potentially lead to an increased greenhouse effect. The increase of the greenhouse effect is a product of the atmosphere in turn warming up. In which case, will open up various affects like linking to flooding in certain regions, droughts in certain regions and overall portray a wide-variety of climate change implications. The warming up of the atmosphere can potentially link to all these factors and events through disrupting the ozone layer, and then possessing effects that can make certain glaciers and ice formations to then melt and result to a rise in sea-level. This can then be observed to produce extreme levels of water that can potentially take over lands and result to crash-floods. In addition, the process in which the warming up of the atmosphere by way of deforestation, could possibly lead to the Sun having increased exposure with stronger UV-rays that will be able to penetrate through the atmosphere. Therefore, manage to result in areas to dry up and have pro-longed exposure compared to regularly amount of sunlight needed. Subsequently, climate change effects like producing unusual weather condition patterns are associated along with warming the atmosphere. This would be through a disrupted ozone layer in the atmosphere and having the earth prone to exposure of increased sunlight in areas in which usually don't have as much sunlight and warmth in particular seasons, and could potentially have prolonged summers along with it, in part of the increased sun rays and the atmosphere possessing additional openings for sunray to come through.

=== Soil erosion ===
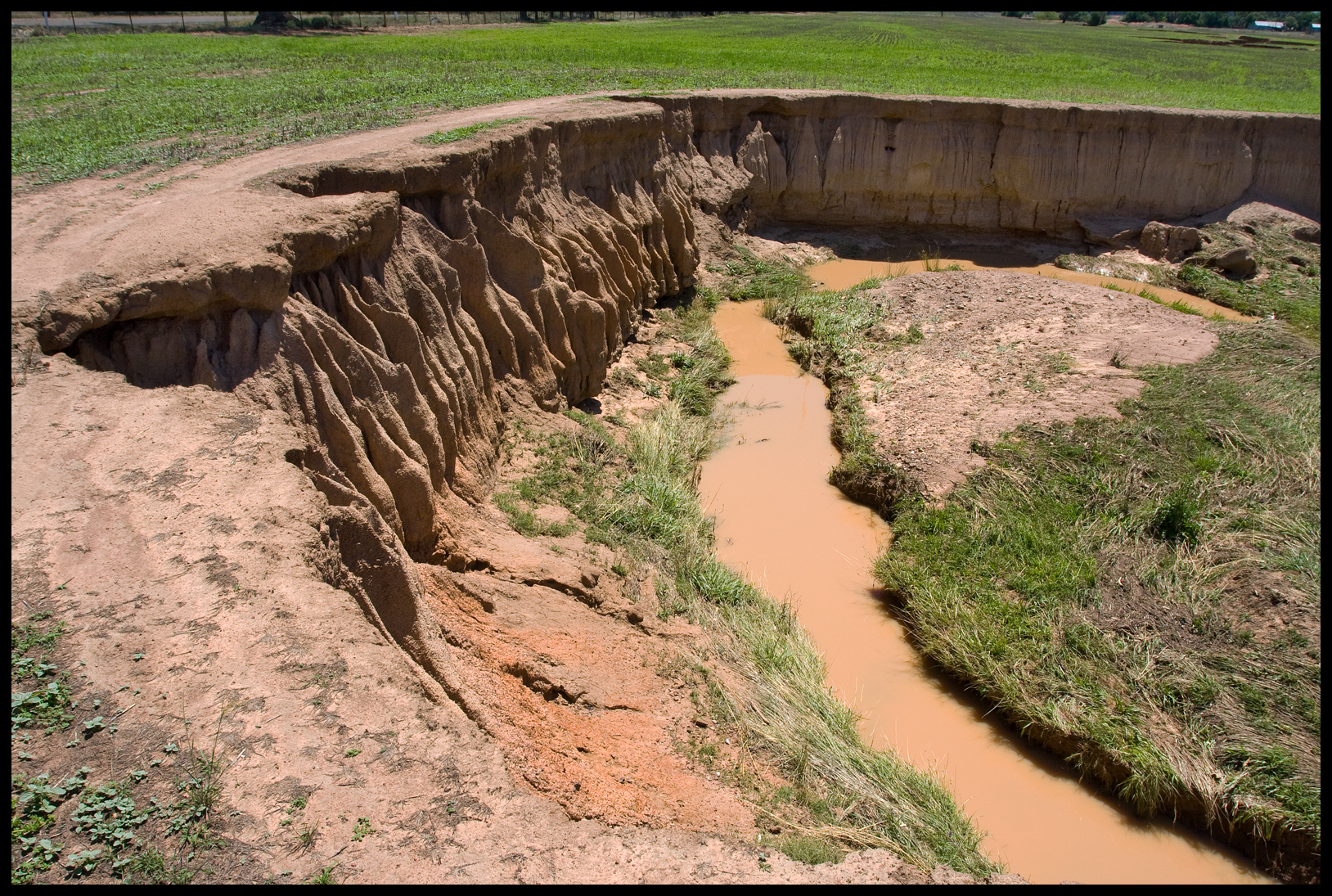
An example of soil erosion in result from anthropogenic related actions like deforestation.

Moreover, another aspect in which is linked to the processes of deforestation is soil erosion. In which is noted as a process that occurs naturally, however it is noted to be faster and produce at a rate that incorporates implications when deforestation occurs. The following trees and plant species are present in environments to essentially slow down the rate at which water is going through in the environment. The roots of the following trees present are there to ensure that the soil is not taken away from the water passing through. In addition, the non-appearance of the trees/plant species could potentially play into the part of the topsoil of the land to erode in a fashion that is rapid like. Eroding of topsoil can have a factor in preventing healthy soil flourish and ensure species grow effectively.

=== Groundwater levels ===
Deforestation is linked to factors affecting groundwater levels. Trees assist and contribute in producing water vapour contents in the atmosphere. Therefore, in the process of deforestation, this can mean less sources of trees to contribute water vapour out to the atmosphere. In which, results to less production of rain and indirectly plays into the factor of possessing adverse effects of the total levels of groundwater available.

== Efforts to reverse the effects ==
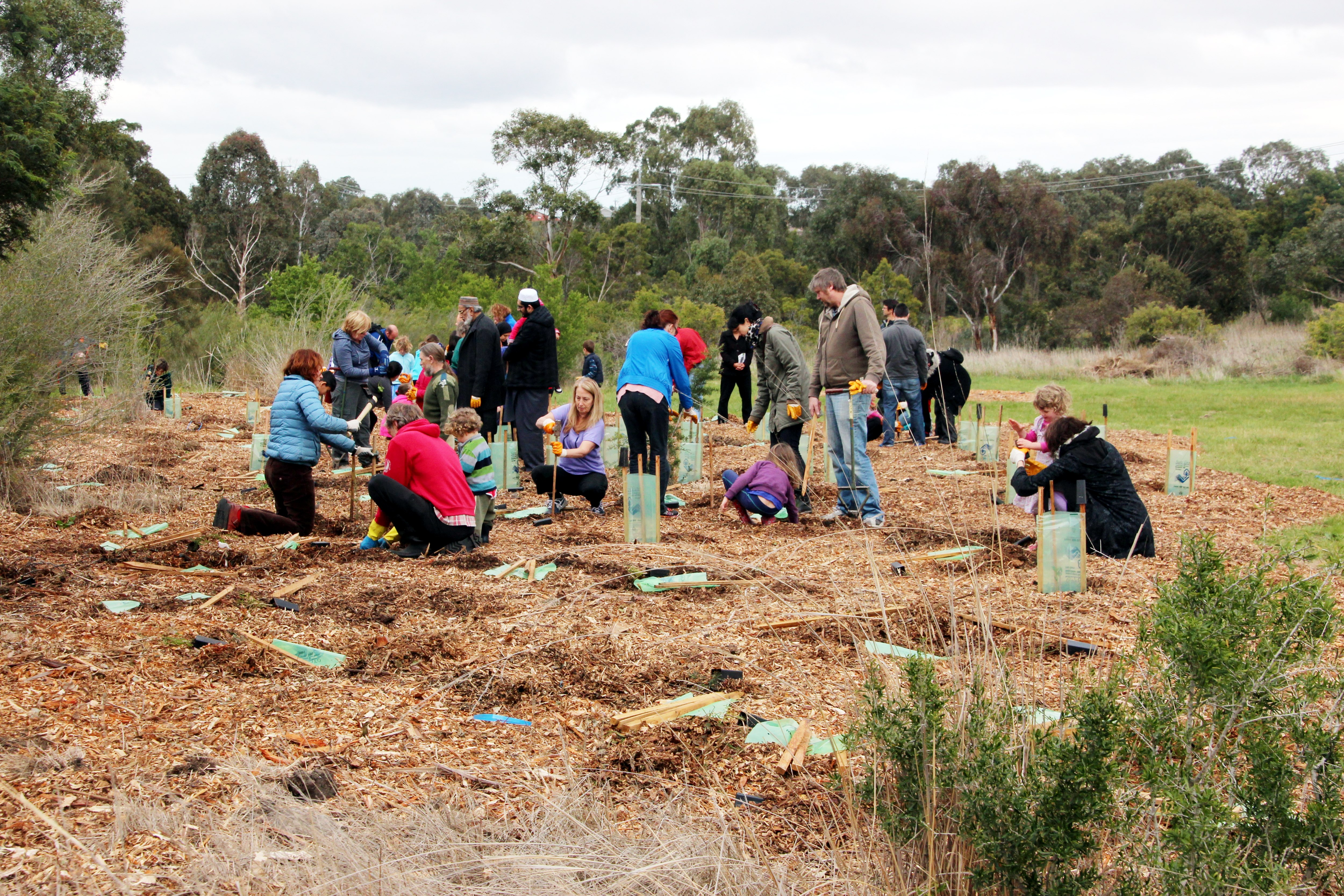
The image depicts an environmental activist organization promoting growth of trees, through planting them in this area. This in turn presents, a possible course of action when attempting to combat deforestation processes.

It is found throughout studies and research that most individuals in Central America still depend on wood and charcoal as their primary fuel source. Hence, displaying how reducing the effective ability to reverse the problem of deforestation in the region could run into implications. However, it is advised from organizations like Conservation International, Trees for the Future and Rainforest Alliance, that regions of the Central America's should promote the replanting of trees in the region. This could be a potential push in the right direction, as this method could help in maintaining balance and reducing carbon emission to the environment. It should be noted and made aware, that the government could also take a course of action to further develop a campaign that promotes local residence in planting more trees and conservation to reduce deforestation. Also, it is strongly advised from various organizations and government parties, that the government should develop policies that protect the locals and grant them land ownership rights for them to fight for their rights and reduce drug trafficking in the region. In addition, other government parties and organizations previously mentioned are vocalizing that local and national governments should regulate the logging practices that are conducted in the areas to ensure that they are replanting trees and maintaining ecological balance. Furthermore, it is suggested that the government, in collaborations with other organizations, should empower the locals towards conservation of local resources through education, creation of jobs, and a proper justice system, among others. Also, regions of the central America's are constantly reminded and heavily advised to promote a sustainable rural economy through agroforestry with cocoa farming.

Many countries have undertaken plans to conserve and replenish the forest in response to the recent upsurge in deforestation. Indigenous leaders, community land managers, and park rangers put their lives every day on the line to protect the forests of Mesoamerica. Also, the community and regional administrators developed the Petén Declaration, which contains a commitment to five specific measures to restore the region's forests: 1) support for local forests and native communities to gain land control; 2) improve the security of protected regions; 3) encourage the prosecution of environmental misconducts; 4) concentrate on illegal livestock as the key cause of deforestation; and protect the locals who are risking their lives to protect the environment.

For example, in Nicaragua, forest management consists of shifting from timber to non-timber harvesting alongside sustainable logging methods. In Costa Rica, logging roads that had once added to the problem of deforestation are being researched as potential avenues of reforestation. Furthermore, in the mid-1990s, "damage-controlled logging practices" were implemented to prevent rampant illegal logging. Suggestions and possible solutions to issues like these, are present to encourage and empower the locals and reverse the rates of deformation in the region.

== See also ==
- Deforestation in the United States
- Endangered species
- Environmental impact of agriculture
- Land use, land-use change, and forestry
- Agricultural expansion
- Geography of Honduras
- Geography of Nicaragua
- Geography of Costa Rica
- Geography of Panama
- Geography of Guatemala
