= Sierra de Santa Cruz =

Sierra de Santa Cruz may refer to:

- Sierra de Santa Cruz (Guatemala), a mountain range in Guatemala
- Sierra de Santa Cruz, Aragon, a mountain range in the Iberian System, Aragon, Spain
- Sierra de Santa Cruz (Extremadura), a mountain range near Trujillo, Extremadura, Spain
