= Climate change in Guatemala =

Emissions, impacts and responses of Guatemala related to climate change

Climate change in Guatemala is a serious issue as Guatemala is considered one of 10 nations most vulnerable to the effects of climate change. In 2010, Guatemala "ranked second in the world on the Global Climate Risk Index, which indicates the level of exposure and vulnerability to extreme events." Both commercial agricultural production and subsistence farming have declined, and thus subsistence farmers find it more difficult to find work as day laborers when their own harvests fail. About 300,000 subsistence farmers reported crop loss due to drought in 2018. About half of Guatemala's workforce is in the agricultural sector. Poor crop yields due to climate change have been identified as a factor in migration to the United States. As of 2026, the country has continued to be damaged by frosts, humidity, heat-drawn invasive insects, and consequently, the lack of communication regarding the well-being of the population.

== Greenhouse gas emissions ==
"Guatemala emitted 40 million metric tons (MtCO2e) of greenhouse gases in 2011, with the land-use change and forestry sector contributing 40 percent to overall emissions. Greenhouse gas emissions grew by 38 percent from 1990 - 2011 with significant contribution from the land-use change and forestry, energy and agriculture sectors."

== Impacts on the natural environment ==
=== Temperature and weather changes ===
Köppen climate classification map for Guatemala for 1980–2016

2071–2100 map under the most intense climate change scenario. Mid-range scenarios are currently considered more likely

A report by the Guatemalan System of Climate Change Sciences in 2019 indicated that rainy season is starting later as a result of climate change, putting subsistence farmers and indigenous people in poor communities at risk of food shortages resulting from poor harvests.

=== Ecosystems ===
Populations of Guatemala's edible giant winged leaf-cutter ant are declining. "Guatemala's zompopos, yellow ants, of May are now the zompopos of June," according to Dr. Edwin Castellanos, of the Universidad del Valle de Guatemala.

== Impacts on people ==
=== Economic impacts ===
==== Agriculture ====
Dry Corridor in Guatemala

Guatemalan farmers have experienced extreme weather events such as hurricanes, as well as erratic weather patterns with spikes and drops in temperature, torrential rains, drought, and unexpected frost. One crop affected has been potatoes, which suffer from fungus.

Guatemala's western highlands are particularly susceptible to climate change, impacting the region's predominantly indigenous population of subsistence farmers. The main crops, potatoes and maize, have been over increasing pressure as hard frosts in the region have become more frequent since 2013. Hard frosts can kill a whole season's worth of crops at once. At lower elevations, new pests are becoming more prevalent and there has been decreased rainfall.

The problem of food security and famine has increased, especially in the "corredor seco" (an area extending from the departments of Izabal and Baja Verapaz in the north to Santa Rosa and Jutiapa in the south).

Other crops affected include coffee and cardamom.

In high-altitude areas such as Los Altos de Chiantla in the department of Huehuetenango, located above 3,000 meters, farmers have reported an increase in dangerous frosts (locally known as hieleras), which can damage potato crops. However, these agricultural outcomes have differed in recent years. Some farmers farmers during the 2020s reported stable or "above-average" harvests, which shows how different the impacts are in Guatemala's mountainous terrain.

Disease

Dengue fever has been one of the most widely reported air-borne diseases in Guatemala between 2019 and today. The disease is transmitted by female Aedes mosquitos, which thrive in warm, humid climates. The rising temperatures caused by climate change may expand these habitats into areas otherwise known for their severe lack of mosquitos. Even a slight temperature increase of 1-2 °C may increase the chance of these insects appearing in higher areas. Some studies note that reported dengue incidences has historically been far lower in territories where many Maya communities live due to the cooler temperatures rather than their demographic background.

=== Impacts on migration ===
In 2018, 50% of the 94,000 Guatemalans deported from the United States and Mexico were from the country's western highlands severely affected by climate change.

In 2019, Palm Beach County, Florida saw an increase in Guatemalan immigrants from the "Dry corridor", seeking to escape hunger caused by periods of drought followed by torrential rains that had impacted their crops.

A study conducted in 2021 by numerous researchers examined migration patterns in the Cuchumátan highlands of Huehuetenango through interviews with the local residents. Respondents were asked general questions about their livelihoods rather than directly about climate change. Many participants answered that they migrated due to economic conditions, limited opportunities, and other social factors as their main motivations. The findings would show that the reason for migration is more-so due to personal reasons, with climate not being as potent, but still a reasonable case.

Economy

As of 2023, Guatemala's economy has grown at a more constant pace than several other Central American countries that surround it. With agriculture, it has been one of Guatemala's front-liners for their economic growth, but with crops, the climate is a major concern to keep exports and imports from delay. Irregular rainfall disrupts the yield amount and could damage nearby plants. These disruptions could also happen to increase the cycle for the plant growth, making for an above-average cost and making it difficult for both the farmers and most of the country to make a living.

== Mitigation and adaptation ==
=== Adaptation ===
US humanitarian aid for projects related climate and agriculture has focused on helping farmers adapt so that they can remain on their land. USAID support for Guatemala has included development of "early-warning systems for floods and fires, as well as promoting soil and watershed conservation, rain water harvesting, and other adaptive practices." According to the GAO, the mandate for studies to determine the impact of these programs on migration has been rescinded. A third round of cuts to US aid has been proposed for FY2020.

US based NGOs which have been active in climate-related projects in the forestry and agricultural sectors experienced funding cuts under the first Trump Administration. For example, Asociación de Cooperación para el Desarrollo Rural de Occidente (C.D.R.O.) was a Guatemalan program originally funded by the United States' government. C.D.R.O. focused on agroforestry and weather monitoring systems to help farmers mitigate the effects of climate change. The organization provided residents with resources to plant new, more adaptable crops to alongside their typical maize to protect the corn from variable temperatures, frost, etc. C.D.R.O. also set up a weather monitoring system to help predict extreme weather events, and would send residents text messages to warn them about periods of frost, extreme heat, humidity, or drought. Funding for the program was cut by the Trump administration in 2017.

As of 2022, remittances from Guatemalans living abroad has exceeded US$19 billion annually. These funds have supported Guatemalans with housing, businesses, and agriculture. In some rural communities, this remittance income has made it so the reliance on home-grown food is reduced, which may lessen dependence on rain-fed farming when the climate is the strongest.

Indigenous people, particularly that of the Mayan descent, represent a very large portion of the Guatemalan population, about 44%, and are also severely affected by climate in the highlands and the corridor. Although Guatemala has sanctioned International Labor Organization Convention 169, which guarantees consultation rights for people such as the Mayans, some observers note that this seems to be inconsistent. Guatemala's policy also references community input and cultural knowledge; however, that has not seemed to be the case with multiple projects ignoring this written right entirely.

As projects, such as hydroelectric and agro-industrial plants, are constantly being built around the country, they have come across Indigenous territories a handful of times. The decision to build upon this land has caused backlash from the community and the residents of this land alike. Many question who should make the decision, or if continuing the development of projects that hinder climate change would generate more social conflict that leads into a temporary or permanent standstill.

Politics

Office in Guatemala has not been able to gain the trust of the public because of their lack of transparency regarding the climate issues. Specifically, the refusal to implement adaptable and disaster prepared policies that would lessen the worry of their citizens, as survey research by World Bank has indicated that that a large portion of the population is exposed to multiple climate disasters.

=== International cooperation ===
Guatemala has joined the V20, a group of 48 developing economies working together with development banks towards climate resilience and 100% renewable energy.

== See also ==
- Climate of Guatemala
- Central American dry corridor
- Central American migrant caravans
- Climate refugees
- Climate finance in Guatemala
