= Craugastor trachydermus =

Conservation status
- Critically Endangered (IUCN 3.1)

Scientific classification
- Kingdom: Animalia
- Phylum: Chordata
- Class: Amphibia
- Order: Anura
- Family: Craugastoridae
- Genus: Craugastor
- Subgenus: Campbellius
- Species: C. trachydermus

Binomial name
- Craugastor trachydermus (Campbell, 1994)

Synonyms
- Eleutherodactylus trachydermus Campbell, 1994

Species of frog

Craugastor trachydermus is a species of frog in the family Craugastoridae. It is endemic to Guatemala and only known from its type locality, Xiacam in the Sierra de Santa Cruz, Izabal Department, where the type series was collected in 1989. The species might already be extinct. However, specimens collected some 10 km (6.2 mi) from the type locality might belong to this species.

== Etymology ==
The specific name trachydermus is derived from the Greek trachys (=rough) and derma (=skin). The name alludes to the extremely rugose nature of this species.

== Description ==
The type series consists of two adult males and two adult females. The males measure 28–34 mm (1.1–1.3 in) and the females 45–46 mm (1.8–1.8 in) in snout–vent length. The snout is ovoid in dorsal view and truncate in profile. The canthus rostralis is well-defined. The tympanum is indistinct in males and hidden in females. The fingers and toes bear discs; the toes have moderate webbing while the fingers are unwebbed. The upper parts of the body, flanks, and upper surface of limbs are strongly granular, with the largest tubercles on the flanks. Dorsal coloration is brown with some indistinct markings; the tubercles are dark brown to black. The venter is yellowish brown with some white blotches.

== Habitat and conservation ==
This species is known from an old-growth premontane wet forest at about 900 m (3,000 ft) above sea level. Individuals were seen on rocks at night along a stream.

Craugastor trachydermus is threatened by habitat loss caused by human settlement, agricultural encroachment, and wood extraction. Chytridiomycosis, an infectious disease, is possibly behind dramatic declines seen in many other stream-dwelling frogs, and could also affect this species.
