= Plant with Purpose =

Nonprofit that fights poverty with environmental healing

Plant With Purpose
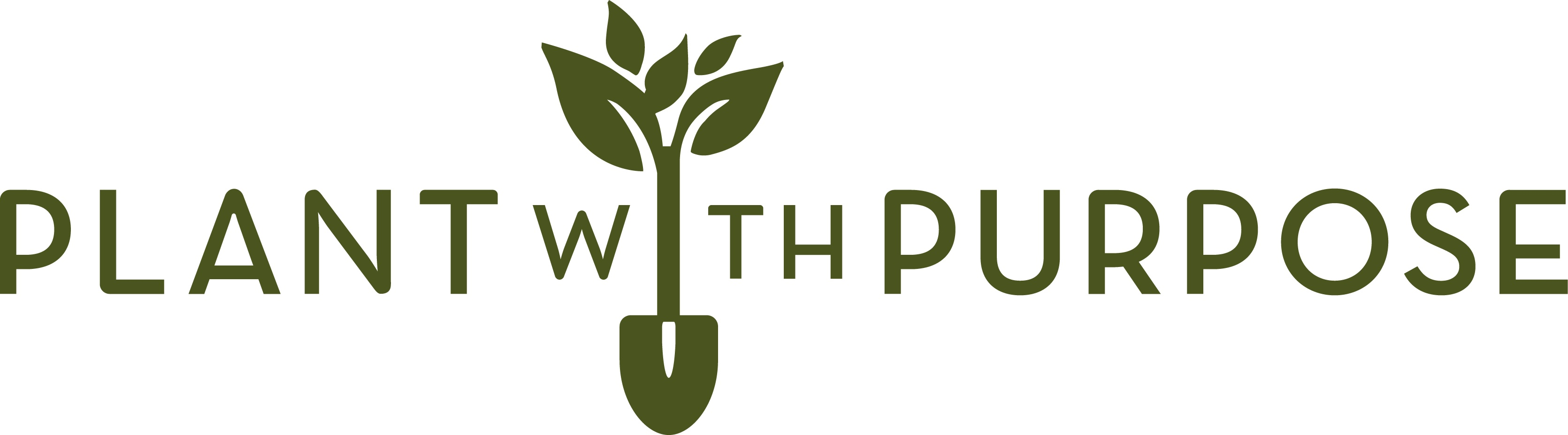
- Founded: 1984
- Type: Non-governmental organization
- Location: San Diego, California
- Region served: Burundi; Dominican Republic; Democratic Republic of the Congo; Ethiopia; Haiti; Mexico; Tanzania; Thailand
- Key people: Scott Sabin (Executive Director)
- Revenue: $5.5M
- Website: www.plantwithpurpose.org

Plant With Purpose (formerly known as Floresta) is a Christian nonprofit organization that works in developing countries around the world with the goal of improving the quality of the lives of people living in extreme rural poverty. Plant With Purpose uses a transformational development approach that brings together environmental restoration, economic empowerment, and spiritual renewal. Plant With Purpose currently works in more than 1,100 communities in eight countries across Africa, the Caribbean, Latin America, and Southeast Asia.

== History ==
Plant With Purpose was founded in 1984 under the original name Floresta. Tom Woodard and his colleagues had travelled to the Dominican Republic to volunteer with an agency doing relief work. According to Woodard, food aid alone would not solve long-term problems caused by deforestation and desperate farming practices that depleted the soil. He realized that farmers needed sustainable methods to meet their immediate needs while also working toward long-term restoration of the land. In response, Woodard developed Floresta to meet the environmental, economic, and spiritual needs of rural communities in the Dominican Republic. Today, Plant With Purpose operates in the Democratic Republic of the Congo, the Dominican Republic, Ethiopia, Burundi, Haiti, Mexico, Tanzania, and Thailand.

=== Timeline ===
1984 Floresta Dominican Republic is founded.

1997 Floresta Haiti is founded.

1999 Misión Integral (Floresta Mexico) is founded.

2004 Floresta Tanzania is founded.

2006 Plant With Purpose first uses the Village Savings and Loan Association (VSLA) method.

2008 Floresta and Upland Holistic Development Project (UHDP) form a partnership in the northern hills of Thailand.

2008 Floresta Burundi becomes the sixth international program.

2010 Floresta is renamed Plant With Purpose.

2012 Plant With Purpose reaches 8 million trees planted worldwide.

2015 Plant With Purpose launches program in the Democratic Republic of the Congo.

2015 Plant With Purpose reaches 16 million trees planted worldwide.

2018 Plant With Purpose launches program in Ethiopia.

2021 Plant With Purpose reaches 40 million trees planted worldwide.

== Rural poverty ==
Today more than 85% of the world's poorest people, or roughly 1.4 billion people live in rural, isolated areas, limiting their access to basic resources. Most rural communities depend on the land for their livelihood and survival. Members of these rural communities often have limited access to financial services like savings and credit, and struggle to procure adequate resources. This makes them extremely vulnerable to external shocks, such as natural disasters, family emergencies, poor crop yields, and civil unrest. Without an established safety net, external shocks can cause rural families to fall deeper into a cycle of poverty.

When left with few options to generate needed income, rural farmers often cut trees to create more farmland or to use or sell as fuelwood. This cycle of deforestation degrades soil, damages habitats and biodiversity, and further exacerbates the problems of rural poverty.

== Methodology ==
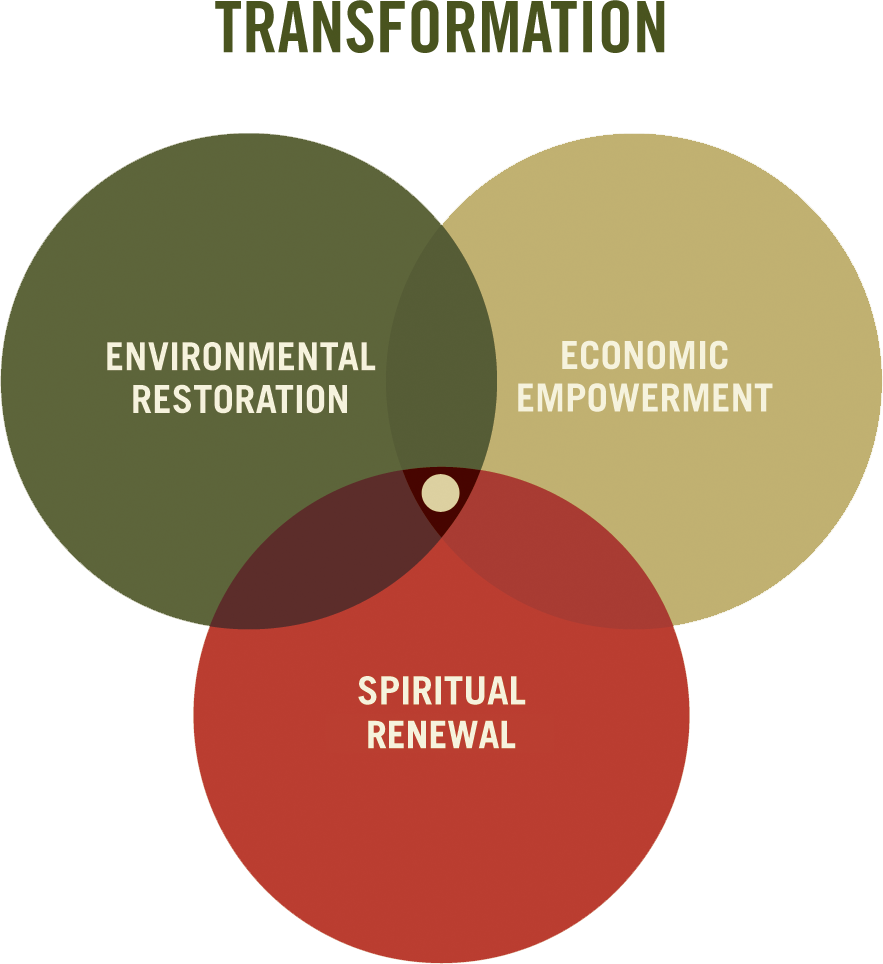
Three-part environmental, economic, and spiritual approach to sustainable development

Plant With Purpose employs a three-part approach for transformational community development that addresses environmental restoration, economic empowerment, and spiritual renewal. The overarching strategy is to provide training and tools that equip rural communities to develop and utilize their own talents and resources to reverse the effects of poverty.

=== Environmental restoration ===
Areas suffering from rural poverty often suffer from environmental degradation as well. Partnering communities receive agricultural training and plant trees to establish reforestation and sustainable farming techniques. The small-scale farmers within these communities can then work to restore the environment while simultaneously producing more income and crop yields.

=== Economic empowerment ===
Plant With Purpose uses the Village Savings and Loan Associations (VSLA) model, created by CARE, to provide a sustainable form of microfinance that allows participants to build capital. This savings-led approach equips self-elected groups to create a financial safety net by saving their own money and making small loans to individuals within the group. The group decides on a fair interest rate, which then go back to the group and increase overall savings.

=== Spiritual renewal ===
Plant With Purpose partners with local churches to develop local leadership and support discipleship efforts. Plant With Purpose also uses a formal program designed to mobilize congregations to be agents of change in their communities by finding solutions to existing needs using local resources. Spiritual programs also tie back into environmental restoration through connection to creation care.

While Plant With Purpose is a Christian organization that works with local churches and Christian leaders as a component of community interactions, participation in its programs is not contingent on religious affiliation, nor does it require participation in Bible studies or church services. Plant With Purpose's Theology of Work curriculum in Burundi is also taught in local mosques and helps facilitate reconciliation in communities.

== International impact ==
=== Burundi ===
In 2008, Plant With Purpose began working in Burundi after the end of a long period of violent conflict. Burundi is one of the five poorest countries in the world and has been rated the hungriest country in the world.

=== Democratic Republic of the Congo ===
In July 2015, Plant With Purpose launched its seventh country program in the Democratic Republic of the Congo. Serving over 6,500 families in 38 communities; focuses on promoting prosperity and peace following the civil war. Working in the areas of greatest environmental degradation in the Kakumba watershed, which is located on the northwest edge of Lake Tanganyika. These rapidly disappearing forests are home to the endangered Eastern Mountain Gorilla.

=== Dominican Republic ===
The Dominican Republic is the first country Plant With Purpose partnered with and has been the longest-running program to date. Of those living in rural Dominican areas, 57% live below the poverty line.

=== Ethiopia ===
Plant with Purpose is serving over 800 families in 90 communities in Ethiopia; focuses on protecting ancient church forests in the Amhara region.

=== Haiti ===
Haiti is recognized as the poorest country in the western hemisphere and has one of the world's highest rates of deforestation. The country is still recovering following a magnitude-7.0 earthquake in 2010. Plant With Purpose has been working in rural Haitian communities since 1997. In rural areas, 88% of Haitians are considered poor (living on less than $2 a day), and 67% are extremely poor (living on less than $1.25 a day).

=== Mexico ===
Plant With Purpose has worked in Oaxaca, Mexico with indigenous communities since 1996 and began working in the neighbouring state of Chiapas in 2012. Oaxaca and Chiapas are two of the three poorest states in Mexico. In Mexico, 61% of rural families live below the poverty line, while 75% of the indigenous population live in poverty. Nearly 25% of this population group - mainly the men - has migrated to the U.S. and other parts of Mexico, leaving many women to provide for themselves and their children.

=== Tanzania ===
Plant With Purpose began working with communities in the Mt. Kilimanjaro region of Tanzania in 2004. The majority of Tanzanian farmers who partner with Plant With Purpose are women. In Tanzania, 98% of rural women who are economically active depend on the land for survival through agriculture.

=== Thailand ===
In 2008, Plant With Purpose began a partnership with an existing organization called the Upland Holistic Development Project (UHDP). The focus of the program is helping marginalized hill tribe communities in Thailand's northern hills. The northern hill tribe communities of Thailand consist of hundreds of thousands of refugees. The majority of ethnic hill tribes people came to Thailand to escape civil strife in Myanmar (Burma).

== Highlights ==
In 2010, Plant With Purpose's Executive Director, Scott Sabin, published Tending to Eden: Environmental Stewardship for God's People. Tending to Eden offers a global perspective on the theological foundation for caring for the earth and its people.

In February 2013, an organization called Wings of Kilimanjaro organized a group of almost 100 para-gliders to climb Mt. Kilimanjaro and fly from the top. The group raised funds for three nonprofits working in Tanzania, including Plant With Purpose.

== See also ==
- Trees for the Future
