= Geography of Guatemala =

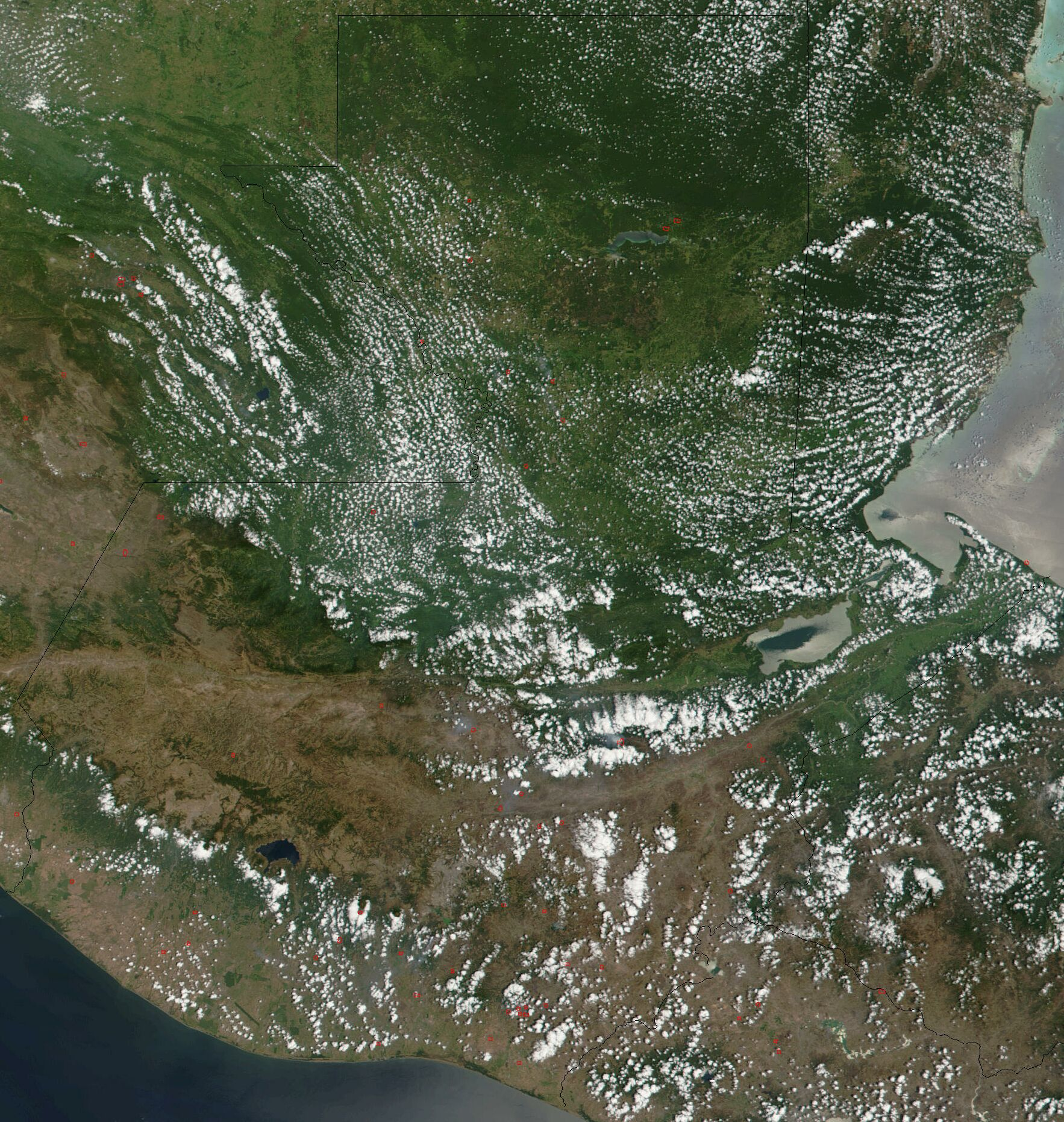
- Satellite image of Guatemala
- Continent: North America
- Region: Central America
- Coordinates: 15°30′N 90°15′W
- Area: Ranked 105th
  - Total: 108,889 km^{2} (42,042 sq mi)
  - Land: 98.41%
  - Water: 1.59%
- Coastline: 400 km (250 mi)
- Borders: total: 1,667 km (1,036 mi)
- Highest point: Tajumulco Volcano; 4,220 m or 13,845 ft
- Lowest point: Pacific Ocean; 0 m
- Longest river: Motagua River; 486 km (302 mi)
- Largest lake: Lake Izabal; 589.6 km^{2} (227.6 mi^{2})
- Exclusive economic zone: 114,170 km^{2} (44,080 mi^{2})

Guatemala is mountainous, except for the south coastal area and the vast northern lowlands of Petén department. The country is located in Central America and bounded to the north and west by Mexico, to the east by Belize and by the Gulf of Honduras, to the east by Honduras, to the southeast by El Salvador, and to the south by the Pacific Ocean. Two mountain chains enter Guatemala from west to east, dividing the country into three major regions: the highlands, where the mountains are located; the Pacific coast, south of the mountains; and the limestone plateau of the Petén region, north of the mountains. These areas vary in climate, elevation, and landscape, providing dramatic contrasts between hot and humid tropical lowlands and highland peaks and valleys.

== Regions ==
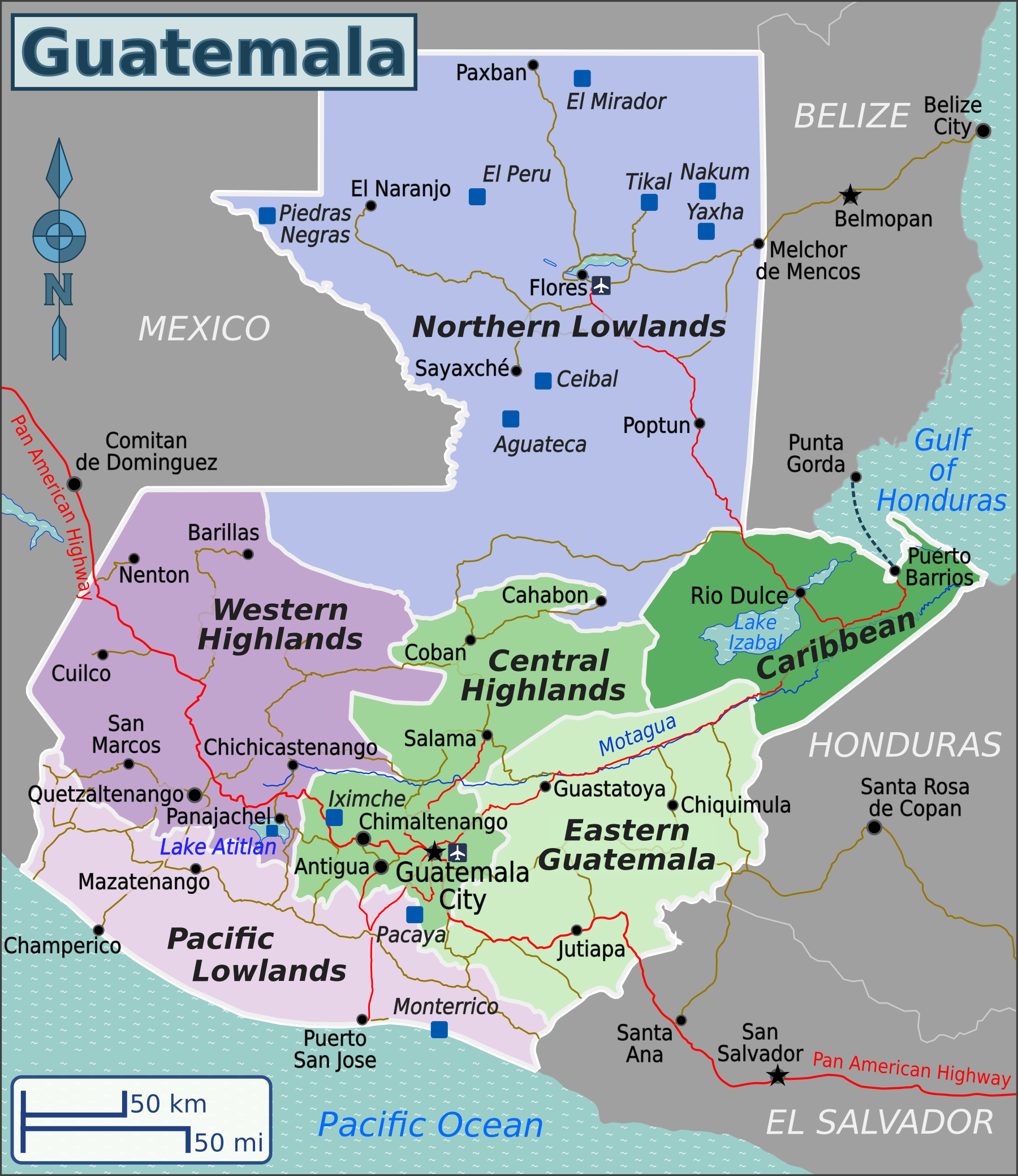
Regions of Guatemala

The southern edge of the western highlands is marked by the Sierra Madre, which stretches from the Mexican border south and east, and continues at lower elevations toward El Salvador. The mountain chain is characterised by steep volcanic cones, including Tajumulco Volcano 4,220 m or 13,845 ft, the highest point in the country and Central America. All of Guatemala's 37 volcanoes (3 of them active: Pacaya, Santiaguito and Fuego), are in this mountain chain, and are abundant in the highlands.

The northern chain of mountains begins near the Mexican border with the Cuchumatanes range, then stretches east through the Chuacús and Chamá sierras, down to the Santa Cruz and Minas sierras, near the Caribbean Sea. The northern and southern mountains are separated by the Motagua valley, where the Motagua river and its tributaries drains from the highlands into the Caribbean being navigable in its lower end, where it forms the boundary with Honduras.

The rivers are short and shallow in the Pacific vertient, larger and deeper, such as the Polochic which drains in Lake Izabal, Río Dulce, Motagua and Sarstún that forms the boundary with Belize in the Caribbean and the Gulf of Mexico vertient (Usumacinta, which forms the boundary between Chiapas, Mexico and Petén and its tributaries such as La Pasión and San Pedro.

Most of the major cities are located in the Highlands. Major cities are the capital Guatemala City, elevation 1,500 m (Central Highlands), Antigua Guatemala, elevation 1,530 m (Central Highlands), Quetzaltenango elevation 2,350 m (Western Highlands) and Puerto Barrios on the Caribbean coast. The largest lake Lago de Izabal (589.6 km^{2}), is close to the Caribbean coast. Volcán Tajumulco, 4,220 m, the highest point in Central America, is located in the western department of San Marcos.

The last major earthquake was on February 4, 1976, killing more than 23,000 in the Central Highlands.

== Climate ==
Guatemala map of Köppen climate classification zones

Climate is hot and humid in the Pacific and Petén Lowlands. It is more temperate in the highlands, to freezing cold at the high of the Cuchumatanes range, and hot/drier in the easternmost departments.

Guatemala's location on the Caribbean Sea and Pacific Ocean makes it a target for hurricanes, including Hurricane Mitch in 1998 and Hurricane Stan in October 2005, which killed more than 1,500 people. The damage was not wind related, but caused by flooding and landslides.

Climate data for Guatemala City (1990-2011)
Month	Jan	Feb	Mar	Apr	May	Jun	Jul	Aug	Sep	Oct	Nov	Dec	Year
Record high °C (°F)	30.0 (86.0)	32.1 (89.8)	32.0 (89.6)	33.9 (93.0)	33.9 (93.0)	31.2 (88.2)	29.1 (84.4)	30.2 (86.4)	29.8 (85.6)	28.6 (83.5)	29.9 (85.8)	28.8 (83.8)	33.9 (93.0)
Mean daily maximum °C (°F)	24.3 (75.7)	25.8 (78.4)	26.8 (80.2)	27.8 (82.0)	27.1 (80.8)	25.8 (78.4)	25.4 (77.7)	25.5 (77.9)	25.1 (77.2)	24.7 (76.5)	24.2 (75.6)	23.9 (75.0)	25.5 (77.9)
Daily mean °C (°F)	18.7 (65.7)	19.7 (67.5)	20.7 (69.3)	21.9 (71.4)	21.9 (71.4)	21.3 (70.3)	20.8 (69.4)	21.0 (69.8)	20.7 (69.3)	20.3 (68.5)	19.4 (66.9)	18.8 (65.8)	20.4 (68.7)
Mean daily minimum °C (°F)	13.2 (55.8)	13.6 (56.5)	14.6 (58.3)	16.0 (60.8)	16.8 (62.2)	16.8 (62.2)	16.3 (61.3)	16.5 (61.7)	16.4 (61.5)	16.0 (60.8)	14.7 (58.5)	13.7 (56.7)	15.4 (59.7)
Record low °C (°F)	6.0 (42.8)	7.8 (46.0)	8.4 (47.1)	8.6 (47.5)	12.3 (54.1)	11.2 (52.2)	12.1 (53.8)	13.5 (56.3)	13.0 (55.4)	11.4 (52.5)	9.4 (48.9)	7.6 (45.7)	6.0 (42.8)
Average rainfall mm (inches)	2.8 (0.11)	5.4 (0.21)	6.0 (0.24)	31.0 (1.22)	128.9 (5.07)	271.8 (10.70)	202.6 (7.98)	202.7 (7.98)	236.6 (9.31)	131.6 (5.18)	48.8 (1.92)	6.6 (0.26)	1,274.8 (50.18)
Average rainy days	1.68	1.45	2.00	4.73	12.36	21.14	18.59	19.04	20.82	14.59	6.18	2.64	125.22
Average relative humidity (%)	74.3	73.4	73.2	74.3	77.3	82.4	80.8	80.9	84.5	82.0	79.2	76.0	77.8
Mean monthly sunshine hours	248.4	236.2	245.6	237.9	184.4	155.3	183.4	191.8	159.0	178.0	211.7	209.2	2,440.9
Source: Instituto Nacional de Sismologia, Vulcanologia, Meteorologia, e Hidrologia

Climate data for Villa Nueva
Month	Jan	Feb	Mar	Apr	May	Jun	Jul	Aug	Sep	Oct	Nov	Dec	Year
Mean daily maximum °C (°F)	25.2 (77.4)	26.1 (79.0)	27.4 (81.3)	27.8 (82.0)	27.5 (81.5)	25.9 (78.6)	25.9 (78.6)	26.2 (79.2)	25.5 (77.9)	25.4 (77.7)	24.9 (76.8)	24.8 (76.6)	26.1 (78.9)
Daily mean °C (°F)	19.4 (66.9)	19.8 (67.6)	20.9 (69.6)	21.7 (71.1)	22.0 (71.6)	21.3 (70.3)	21.2 (70.2)	21.3 (70.3)	20.9 (69.6)	20.7 (69.3)	19.8 (67.6)	19.3 (66.7)	20.7 (69.2)
Mean daily minimum °C (°F)	13.6 (56.5)	13.6 (56.5)	14.5 (58.1)	15.7 (60.3)	16.6 (61.9)	16.8 (62.2)	16.6 (61.9)	16.4 (61.5)	16.4 (61.5)	16.0 (60.8)	14.8 (58.6)	13.8 (56.8)	15.4 (59.7)
Average precipitation mm (inches)	1 (0.0)	3 (0.1)	5 (0.2)	26 (1.0)	126 (5.0)	253 (10.0)	217 (8.5)	182 (7.2)	244 (9.6)	130 (5.1)	16 (0.6)	5 (0.2)	1,208 (47.5)
Source: Climate-Data.org

Climate data for Cobán
Month	Jan	Feb	Mar	Apr	May	Jun	Jul	Aug	Sep	Oct	Nov	Dec	Year
Mean daily maximum °C (°F)	21.7 (71.1)	23.4 (74.1)	24.5 (76.1)	25.2 (77.4)	25.2 (77.4)	24.7 (76.5)	23.9 (75.0)	24.4 (75.9)	24.3 (75.7)	23.4 (74.1)	22.3 (72.1)	21.6 (70.9)	23.7 (74.7)
Daily mean °C (°F)	16.1 (61.0)	17.3 (63.1)	18.3 (64.9)	19.4 (66.9)	20.0 (68.0)	20.3 (68.5)	19.8 (67.6)	19.9 (67.8)	19.8 (67.6)	18.9 (66.0)	17.6 (63.7)	16.7 (62.1)	18.7 (65.6)
Mean daily minimum °C (°F)	10.5 (50.9)	11.2 (52.2)	12.1 (53.8)	13.7 (56.7)	14.9 (58.8)	16.0 (60.8)	15.7 (60.3)	15.4 (59.7)	15.4 (59.7)	14.4 (57.9)	13.0 (55.4)	11.8 (53.2)	13.7 (56.6)
Average rainfall mm (inches)	108 (4.3)	86 (3.4)	99 (3.9)	93 (3.7)	169 (6.7)	293 (11.5)	262 (10.3)	231 (9.1)	302 (11.9)	288 (11.3)	216 (8.5)	126 (5.0)	2,273 (89.6)
Source: Climate-Data.org; Instituto Nacional de Sismología, Vulcanología, Meteorología e Hidrología de Guatemala

=== Climate change ===
Climate change in Guatemala is a serious issue as Guatemala is considered one of 10 nations most vulnerable to the effects of climate change. In 2010, Guatemala "ranked second in the world on the Global Climate Risk Index, which indicates the level of exposure and vulnerability to extreme events." Both commercial agricultural production and subsistence farming have declined, and thus subsistence farmers find it more difficult to find work as day laborers when their own harvests fail. About 300,000 subsistence farmers reported crop loss due to drought in 2018. About half of Guatemala's workforce is in the agricultural sector. Poor crop yields due to climate change have been identified as a factor in migration to the United States. As of 2026, the country has continued to be damaged by frosts, humidity, heat-drawn invasive insects, and consequently, the lack of communication regarding the well-being of the population.

== Forests ==
=== Tree cover extent and loss ===
Global Forest Watch publishes annual estimates of tree cover loss and 2000 tree cover extent derived from time-series analysis of Landsat satellite imagery in the Global Forest Change dataset. In this framework, tree cover refers to vegetation taller than 5 m (including natural forests and tree plantations), and tree cover loss is defined as the complete removal of tree cover canopy for a given year, regardless of cause.

For Guatemala, country statistics report cumulative tree cover loss of 1,890,560 ha (18,905.6 km^{2}) from 2001 to 2024 (about 24.6% of its 2000 tree cover area). For tree cover density greater than 30%, country statistics report a 2000 tree cover extent of 7,691,097 ha (76,910.97 km^{2}). The charts and table below display this data. In simple terms, the annual loss number is the area where tree cover disappeared in that year, and the extent number shows what remains of the 2000 tree cover baseline after subtracting cumulative loss. Forest regrowth is not included in the dataset.

Annual tree cover loss in Guatemala, 2001–2024. View chart definition.
Tree cover extent in 2000 minus cumulative tree cover loss in Guatemala, 2001–2024 (loss-only residual; does not account for gain). View chart definition.

Annual tree cover extent and loss
Year	Tree cover extent (km2) (Note: This residual measure does not include forest regrowth.)	Annual tree cover loss (km2)
2001	76,377.83	533.14
2002	75,821.75	556.08
2003	74,839.61	982.14
2004	74,275.20	564.41
2005	73,267.07	1,008.13
2006	72,741.85	525.22
2007	71,477.09	1,264.76
2008	70,705.62	771.47
2009	69,835.83	869.79
2010	69,240.50	595.33
2011	68,835.17	405.33
2012	67,994.90	840.27
2013	67,443.12	551.78
2014	66,824.28	618.84
2015	66,281.94	542.34
2016	64,496.61	1,785.33
2017	63,698.61	798.00
2018	62,987.32	711.29
2019	62,084.70	902.62
2020	61,099.08	985.62
2021	60,600.09	498.99
2022	60,136.35	463.74
2023	59,425.36	710.99
2024	58,005.37	1,419.99

=== REDD+ reference level and monitoring ===
Under the UNFCCC REDD+ framework, Guatemala has submitted a national forest reference emission level (FREL). On the UNFCCC REDD+ Web Platform, the country's 2022 submission is listed as having an assessed reference level and a reported national strategy, while safeguards information and a national forest monitoring system are listed as "not reported".

The FREL was submitted in 2022 and technically assessed in 2024. It covers three REDD+ activities at national scale - reducing emissions from deforestation, reducing emissions from forest degradation, and enhancement of forest carbon stocks - and uses a 2006-2016 historical reference period. The technical assessment reported that the original submission proposed a FREL of 15,329,948.74 t CO2 eq per year, which was revised during the assessment process to an assessed FREL of 13,537,504.96 t CO2 eq per year.

The technical assessment states that the benchmark is the annual average of net CO2 emissions associated with deforestation and forest degradation, together with removals from enhancement of forest carbon stocks. It included above-ground biomass and below-ground biomass, while excluding deadwood, litter and soil organic carbon, and no adjustment for national circumstances was applied. The forest definition used for the FREL was land of at least 0.5 hectares, at least 5 metres in height, at least 30 percent canopy cover, minimum width of 60 metres, and trees with a minimum diameter of 10 cm.

== Geographic data ==
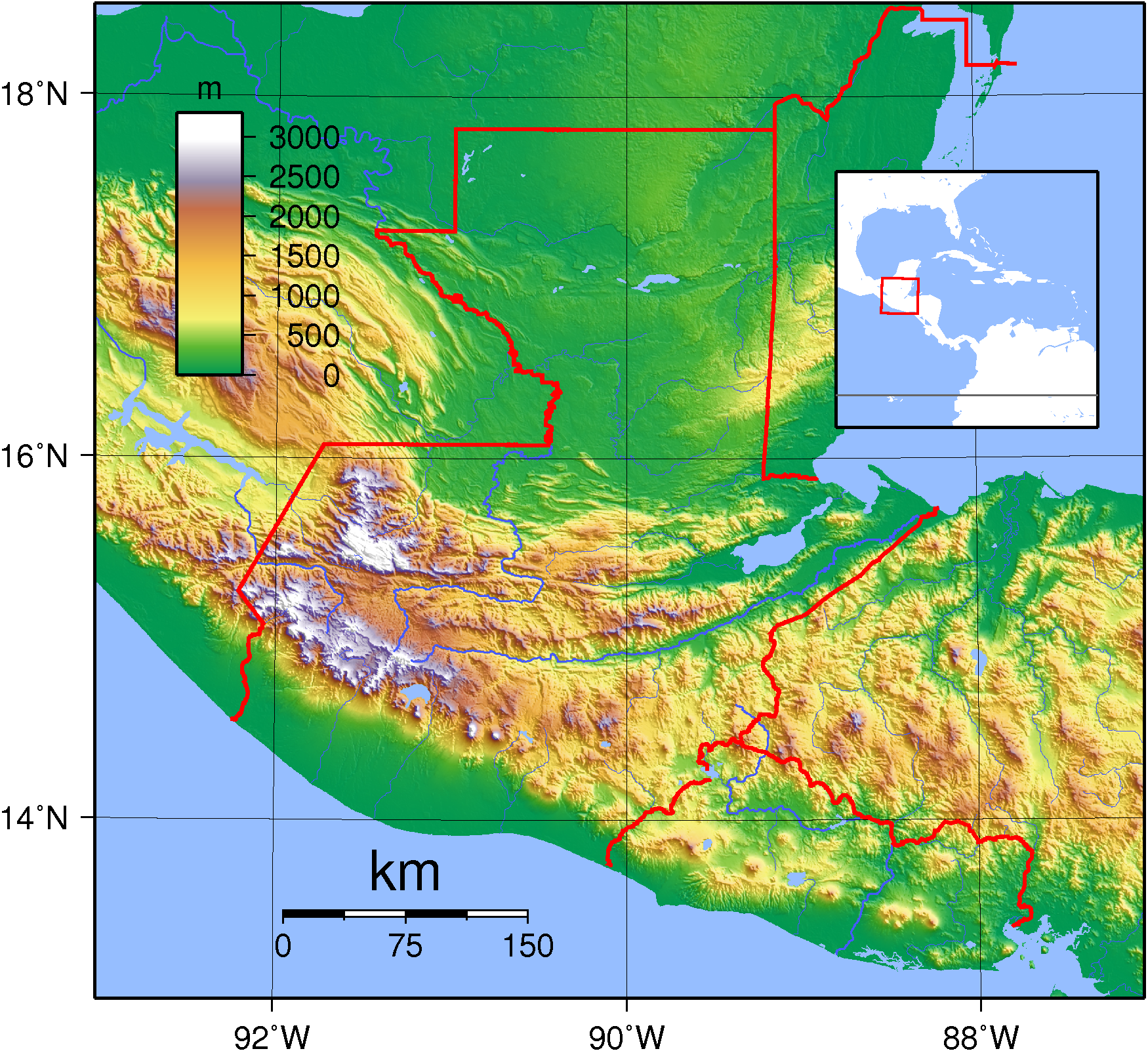
Guatemala's topography.

Geographic coordinates
15°30′N 90°15′W
Map references
Central America and the Caribbean
Area
- Total: 108,889 km^{2}
- Land: 107,159 km^{2}
Land boundaries
- Total: 1,667 km
- Border countries: Belize 266 km, El Salvador 199 km, Honduras 244 km, Mexico 958 km
Coastline
400 km

Territorial waters of Guatemala

Maritime claims
- Territorial sea: 12 nmi (22 km)
- Exclusive economic zone: 114,170 km^{2} (44,080 mi^{2}) and 200 nmi (370 km)
- Continental shelf: 200 m depth or to the depth of exploitation
Extreme points
- Northernmost point – border with Mexico, Petén Department
- Southernmost point – border with El Salvador, near Garita Chapina, Jutiapa Department
- Westernmost point – border with Mexico on Pacific coast, San Marcos Department
- Easternmost point – border with Honduras, Izabal Department
- Lowest point – Pacific Ocean and Caribbean Sea: 0 m
- Highest point – Volcán Tajumulco: 4,220 m
Natural resources
Petroleum, nickel, rare woods, fish, chicle, hydropower
Land use
- Arable land: 14.32%
- Permanent crops: 8.82%
- Other: 76.87% (2012 est.)
Irrigated land
3,121 km^{2} (2003)
Total renewable water resources
111.3 km^{3} (2011)
Freshwater withdrawal (domestic/industrial/agricultural)
- total: 3.46 km^{3}/yr (15%/31%/54%)
- per capita: 259.1 m^{3}/yr (2006)
Natural hazards
Several active volcanoes, occasional violent earthquakes; Caribbean coast subject to hurricanes and other tropical storms, causing flooding, mudflows and landslides
Environment—current issues
Deforestation; soil erosion; water pollution
Environment—international agreements
- Party to: Antarctic Treaty, Biodiversity, Climate Change, Climate Change-Kyoto Protocol, Desertification, Endangered Species, Environmental Modification, Hazardous Wastes, Law of the Sea, Marine Dumping, Nuclear Test Ban, Ozone Layer Protection, Ship Pollution (MARPOL 73/78), Wetlands
- Signed, but not ratified: Antarctic-Environmental Protocol
Geography—note
No natural harbors on west coast

== See also ==
- Biodiversity of Guatemala
- List of earthquakes in Guatemala
- List of national parks of Guatemala
- List of places in Guatemala
- List of rivers of Guatemala
- List of volcanoes in Guatemala
- Water resources management in Guatemala
