= Trees for the Future =

American non-profit organization

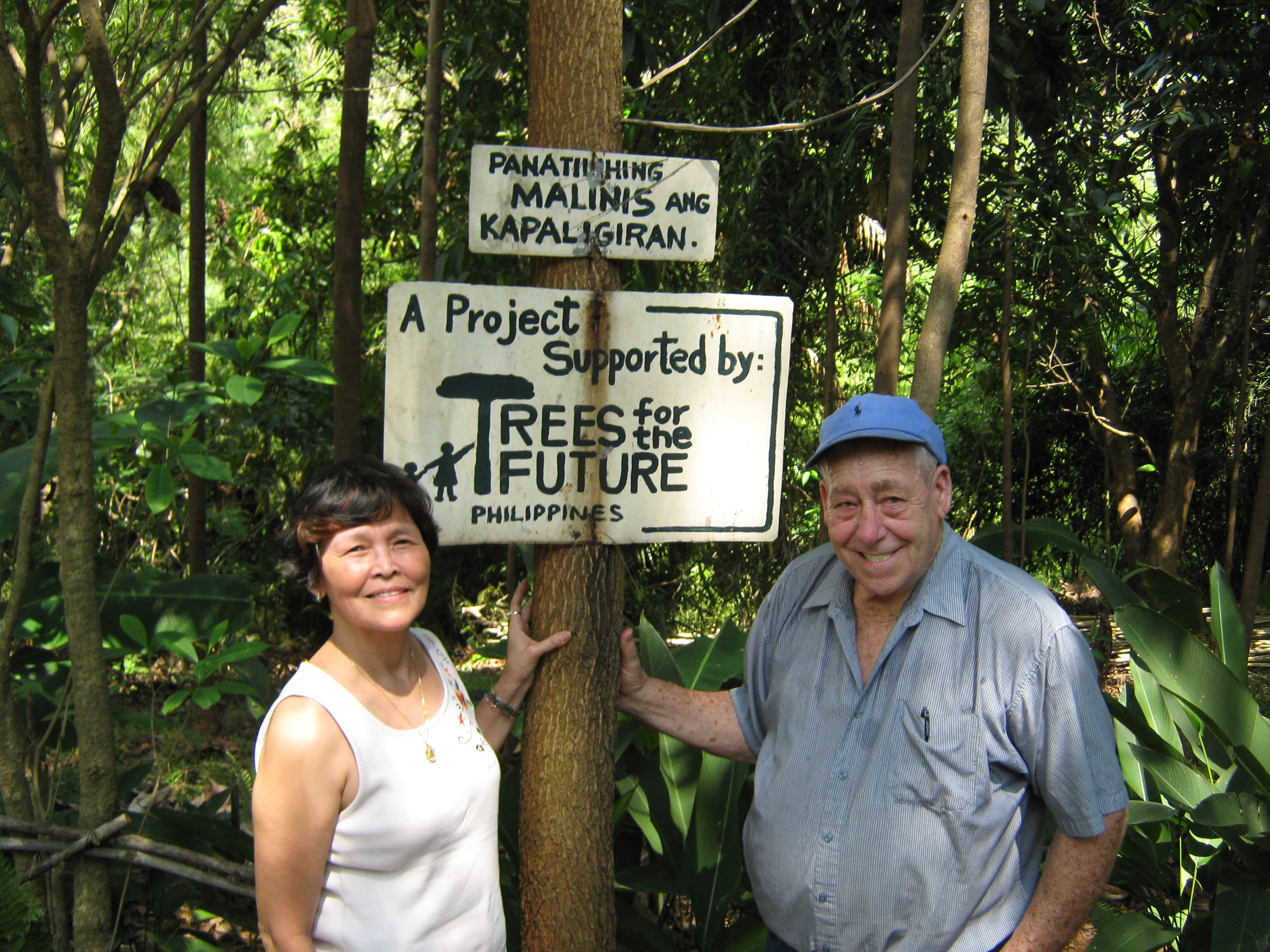
- Abbreviation: TREES
- Formation: August 14, 1989; 37 years ago
- Founders: Grace and Dave Deppner
- Type: Nonprofit organization
- Tax ID no.: 52-1644869
- Legal status: 501(c)(3)
- Headquarters: Washington, DC
- Region served: Global
- Fields: Agroforestry, sustainable development, agricultural training and extension
- CEO: Tim McLellan
- Employees: 220+ FTEs
- Website: trees.org

Trees for the Future (abbreviated sometimes as TREES) is an American nonprofit organization working in agroforestry and sustainable land use.

== Overview ==
TREES trains farmers, giving them instruction on planting trees on their own farms and integrating them into regenerative agricultural systems.

The organization says it has planted over 370 million trees with more than 40,000 farmers in 50 countries across Latin America, South America, Sub-Saharan Africa and Southeast Asia since its founding. In June 2021, it announced its intention to plant one billion trees as part of global reforestation efforts led by the United Nations Decade on Ecosystem Restoration.

Farmers typically spend 4 years in the TREES program. The aim of the training is to equip farmers to regenerate the soil through the planting of trees, with many downstream environmental benefits. Trees are planted in one acre plots, usually containing about 2,500 trees each. According to the organization, each of these plots offsets an average of 144.64 metric tons of carbon dioxide (CO_{2}) over 20 years.

== History ==
Trees for the Future, originally called The New Forests Project, was incorporated as a 501(c)(3) nonprofit in 1989 by Dave Deppner.

In June 1993, Trees for the Future was invited to join the White House panel on Global Climate Change, where it served until 2000.

In response to Hurricane Mitch in November 1998, TREES began planting trees in Honduras and later expanded across Central America. By December 2003, it claimed to have planted 30 million trees globally.

On September 10, 2011, TREES' Executive Director Dave Deppner died and was replaced by John Leary. In 2015, the organization ended many of its active projects around the world to focus on Sub-Saharan Africa, starting with Senegal, Tanzania, Uganda, Cameroon, and Kenya. It also announced a new strategic goal, to plant 500 million trees by 2025.

By 2021, TREES claimed to have planted 316 million trees around the world.

In February 2024, TREES was named a UN World Restoration Flagship by the United Nations Decade on Ecosystem Restoration.

== See also ==
- Ecosia
- Plant with Purpose
