= Sierra de Santa Cruz (Guatemala) =

Mountain range in Guatemala

- Location within Guatemala

Highest point
- Elevation: 1,100 m (3,600 ft)
- Coordinates: 15°40′52″N 89°19′37″W

Dimensions
- Length: 55 km (34 mi) south-west to north-east
- Width: 13 km (8.1 mi)

Geography
- Country: Guatemala
- Department: Izabal

Geology
- Rock age: Mesozoic (Cretaceous)

The Sierra de Santa Cruz is a small mountain range in eastern Guatemala. It is situated north of Lake Izabal, in the department of Izabal. The mountain range has a south-west to north-east orientation, and is approximately 55 km long and 13 km wide. Its highest peaks have an altitude of approximately 1100 m (15.68122°N 89.32692°W).

== Fauna ==
Craugastor trachydermus, a species of frog in the family Craugastoridae, is endemic to Guatemala and only known from its type locality, Xiacam in the Sierra de Santa Cruz. It is critically endangered.

== See also ==
- Geography of Guatemala
